= List of esters =

An ester of carboxylic acid. R stands for any group (organic or inorganic) and R′ stands for organyl group.

In chemistry, an ester is a compound derived from an acid (organic or inorganic) in which the hydrogen atom (H) of at least one acidic hydroxyl group (−OH) of that acid is replaced by an organyl group (−R). Analogues derived from oxygen replaced by other chalcogens belong to the ester category as well (i.e. esters of acidic −SH, −SeH, −TeH, −PoH and −LvH groups). According to some authors, organyl derivatives of acidic hydrogen of other acids are esters as well (e.g. amides), but not according to the IUPAC.

An example of an ester formation is the substitution reaction between a carboxylic acid (R−C(=O)−OH) and an alcohol (R'OH), forming an ester (R−C(=O)−O−R'), where R and R′ are organyl groups, or H in the case of esters of formic acid. Glycerides, which are fatty acid esters of glycerol, are important esters in biology, being one of the main classes of lipids, and making up the bulk of animal fats and vegetable oils. Esters of carboxylic acids with low molecular weight are commonly used as fragrances and found in essential oils and pheromones. Phosphoesters form the backbone of DNA molecules. Nitrate esters, such as nitroglycerin, are known for their explosive properties, while polyesters are important plastics, with monomers linked by ester moieties. Esters of carboxylic acids usually have a sweet smell and are considered high-quality solvents for a broad array of plastics, plasticizers, resins, and lacquers. They are also one of the largest classes of synthetic lubricants on the commercial market.

== By number of R' group carbons (R−C(=O)−O−R') ==
=== 1 carbon ===
Name	Structure
Methyl nitrate	
Methyl formate	
Methyl acetate	
Methyl acrylate	
Methyl propionate	
Methyl butyrate	
Methyl pentanoate	
Methyl benzoate	
Methyl anthranilate	
Methyl salicylate	
Methyl phenylacetate	
Methyl cinnamate	

=== 2 carbons ===
Name	Structure
Ethyl formate	
Ethyl acetate	
Ethyl propionate	
Ethyl lactate	
Ethyl butyrate	
Ethyl pentanoate	
Ethyl isovalerate	
Ethyl hexanoate	
Ethyl heptanoate	
Ethyl benzoate	
Ethyl salicylate	
Ethyl octanoate	
Ethyl cinnamate	
Ethyl decanoate	

=== 3 carbons ===
Name	Structure
Propyl acetate	
Propyl propanoate	
Propyl hexanoate	
Allyl hexanoate	
Isopropyl acetate	
Isopropyl salicylate	
Isopropyl palmitate	

=== 4 carbons ===
Name	Structure
Butyl formate	
Butyl acetate	
Isobutyl formate	
Isobutyl acetate	
Sec-Butyl formate	
Sec-Butyl acetate	
Tert-Butyl formate	
Tert-Butyl acetate	
Butyl butyrate	

=== 5 carbons ===
Name	Structure
Pentyl acetate	
Pentyl butyrate	
Pentyl propanoate	
Pentyl hexanoate	
Sec-Amyl acetate	

=== 7 carbons ===
Name	Structure
Benzyl acetate	

=== 8 carbons ===
Name	Structure
Octyl acetate	

=== 10 carbons ===
Name	Structure
Geranyl acetate	
Bornyl acetate	
Linalyl acetate	

== By number of R group carbons (R−C(=O)−O−R') ==
=== 0 carbons ===
Name	Structure
Methyl nitrate	

=== 1 carbon ===
Name	Structure
Methyl formate	
Ethyl formate	
Isobutyl formate	

=== 2 carbons ===
Name	Structure
Methyl acetate	
Ethyl acetate	
Propyl acetate	
Butyl acetate	
Amyl acetate	
Benzyl acetate	
Octyl acetate	
Geranyl acetate	
Bornyl acetate	
Linalyl acetate	

=== 3 carbons ===
Name	Structure
Methyl propionate	
Ethyl propionate	
Propyl propanoate	
Pentyl propanoate	
Ethyl lactate	

=== 4 carbons ===
Name	Structure
Methyl butyrate	
Ethyl butyrate	
Butyl butyrate	
Pentyl butyrate	

=== 5 carbons ===
Name	Structure
Methyl pentanoate	
Ethyl pentanoate	
Pentyl pentanoate	
Ethyl isovalerate	

=== 6 carbons ===
Name	Structure
Ethyl hexanoate	
Propyl hexanoate	
Allyl hexanoate	
Pentyl hexanoate	

=== 7 carbons ===
Name	Structure
Ethyl heptanoate	
Methyl benzoate	
Ethyl benzoate	
Methyl anthranilate	
Methyl salicylate	
Ethyl salicylate	
Isopropyl salicylate	

=== 8 carbons ===
Name	Structure
Ethyl octanoate	
Methyl phenylacetate	

=== 9 carbons ===
Name	Structure
Methyl cinnamate	
Ethyl cinnamate	

=== 10 carbons ===
Name	Structure
Ethyl decanoate	

=== 16 carbons ===
Name	Structure
Isopropyl palmitate	

== List of ester odorants ==
Many esters of carboxylic acid have distinctive fruit-like odors, and many occur naturally in fruits and the essential oils of plants. This has also led to their common use in artificial flavorings and fragrances which aim to mimic those odors.

Ester name	Structure	Odor or occurrence
Allyl hexanoate		pineapple
Benzyl acetate		pear, strawberry, jasmine
Bornyl acetate		pine
Butyl acetate		apple, honey
Butyl butyrate		pineapple
Butyl propanoate		pear drops
Ethyl acetate		nail polish remover, model paint, model airplane glue
Ethyl benzoate		sweet, wintergreen, fruity, medicinal, cherry, grape
Ethyl butyrate		banana, pineapple, strawberry
Ethyl hexanoate		pineapple, waxy-green banana
Ethyl cinnamate		cinnamon
Ethyl formate		lemon, rum, strawberry
Ethyl heptanoate		apricot, cherry, grape, raspberry
Ethyl isovalerate		apple
Ethyl lactate		butter, cream
Ethyl nonanoate		grape
Ethyl pentanoate		apple
Geranyl acetate		geranium
Geranyl butyrate		cherry
Geranyl pentanoate		apple
Isobutyl acetate		cherry, raspberry, strawberry
Isobutyl formate		raspberry
Isoamyl acetate		pear, banana (flavoring in Pear drops)
Isopropyl acetate		fruity
Linalyl acetate		lavender, sage
Linalyl butyrate		peach
Linalyl formate		apple, peach
Methyl acetate		glue
Methyl anthranilate		grape, jasmine
Methyl benzoate		fruity, ylang ylang, feijoa
Methyl butyrate (methyl butanoate)		pineapple, apple, strawberry
Methyl cinnamate		strawberry
Methyl pentanoate (methyl valerate)		flowery
Methyl phenylacetate		honey
Methyl salicylate (oil of wintergreen)		Modern root beer, wintergreen, Germolene and Ralgex ointments (UK)
Nonyl caprylate		orange
Octyl acetate		fruity-orange
Octyl butyrate		parsnip
Amyl acetate (pentyl acetate)		apple, banana
Pentyl butyrate (amyl butyrate)		apricot, pear, pineapple
Pentyl hexanoate (amyl caproate)		apple, pineapple
Pentyl pentanoate (amyl valerate)		apple
Propyl acetate		pear
Propyl hexanoate		blackberry, pineapple, cheese, wine
Propyl isobutyrate		rum
Terpenyl butyrate		cherry

== Lactones ==
Lactones are a specific class cyclic carboxylic esters that are formed through intramolecular esterification.

Lactone name	Structure
β-propiolactone	
γ-butyrolactone (GBL)	
D-glucono-δ-lactone (E575)	
ε-caprolactone	
