= Methyl heptanoate =

Names
- IUPAC name Methyl heptanoate
- Other names Methyl heptylate Methyl enanthate Methyl oenanthate Heptanoic acid, methyl ester

Identifiers
CAS Number	106-73-0
3D model (JSmol)	Interactive image
ChEBI	CHEBI:88620
ChemSpider	7538
ECHA InfoCard	100.003.118
EC Number	203-428-8
PubChem CID	7826
UNII	1J543V5703
CompTox Dashboard (EPA)	DTXSID3059345
- InChI: Key: XNCNNDVCAUWAIT-UHFFFAOYSA-N; InChI=1S/C8H16O2/c1-3-4-5-6-7-8(9)10-2/h3-7H2,1-2H3
- SMILES: CCCCCCC(=O)OC

Properties
Chemical formula	C_{8}H_{16}O_{2}
Molar mass	144.214 g·mol^{−1}
Appearance	Colorless liquid
Density	0.880 g/cm^{3} (20 °C)
Melting point	−56 °C (−69 °F; 217 K)
Boiling point	171–172 °C (340–342 °F; 444–445 K)
Solubility in water	Insoluble in water

Hazards
- GHS labelling
Pictograms	(GHS02: Flammable) (GHS07: Exclamation mark)
Signal word	Warning
Hazard statements	H226, H315
Precautionary statements	P210, P233, P240, P241, P242, P243, P264, P280, P302+P352, P303+P361+P353, P321, P332+P317, P362+P364, P370+P378, P403+P235, P501
Flash point	52 °C (126 °F; 325 K)
- Lethal dose or concentration (LD, LC)
LD_{50} (median dose)	> 5,000 mg/kg (oral, rat) > 5,000 mg/kg (dermal, rabbit)

Related compounds
Related compounds	Methyl formate; Methyl acetate; Methyl propionate; Methyl butyrate; Methyl pentanoate; Methyl hexanoate; Methyl octanoate; Methyl nonanoate; Methyl decanoate; Methyl laurate; Ethyl heptanoate
- Except where otherwise noted, data are given for materials in their standard state (at 25 °C [77 °F], 100 kPa). Infobox references

Methyl heptanoate is an organic compound with the chemical formula CH_{3}(CH_{2})_{5}CO_{2}CH_{3}. It is the methyl ester of heptanoic acid (also known as enanthic acid). This fatty acid ester is a colorless, oily liquid with a fruity, wine-like odor that is used in the flavor and fragrance industries.

== Properties ==
Methyl heptanoate is a colorless to pale yellow liquid at room temperature. It has a characteristic orris, winey, brandy-like aroma with cognac and fruity undertones. The compound is practically insoluble in water but miscible with most organic solvents and oils.

== Occurrence and production ==
Methyl heptanoate occurs naturally in trace amounts in some fruits and fermented products. It has been identified as a volatile component in fruits such as strawberries, grapes, and wine and in flowering plants such as Astragalus.

Commercially, it is produced by esterification of heptanoic acid with methanol in the presence of an acid catalyst (typically sulfuric acid) or via transesterification of triglycerides containing heptanoic acid. It is also available through the methanolysis of natural oils that contain other heptanoate esters.

== Uses ==
Methyl heptanoate is primarily used in the flavor and fragrance industry:

- As a component of artificial cognac, brandy, wine, and fruit flavorings
- In perfumes to impart green, fruity, and winey notes
- As a trace ingredient in strawberry, grape, and other fruit flavor compositions

It is approved as a flavoring agent in many countries and has the FEMA number 2705.

== Safety ==
Methyl heptanoate has low acute toxicity; its LD_{50}s include > 5,000 mg/kg (oral, rat) and > 5,000 mg/kg (dermal, rabbit). It may cause mild skin and eye irritation upon direct contact. The compound is combustible, but does not present a fire or explosion hazard beyond those typical of flammable esters.
