= C7H14O2 =

The molecular formula C_{7}H_{14}O_{2} may refer to:

- Amyl acetate
- sec-Amyl acetate
- n-Butyl glycidyl ether
- Butyl propionate
  - n-Butyl propionate
  - sec-Butyl propionate
  - Isobutyl propionate
  - tert-Butyl propionate
- Ethyl isovalerate
- Ethyl pentanoate
- Heptanoic acid
- Isoamyl acetate
- Methyl hexanoate
