= C6H12O2 =

The molecular formula C_{6}H_{12}O_{2} (Molar mass: 116.15 g/mol) may refer to:

- Carboxylic acids with formula C_{6}H_{12}O_{2}:
  - Hexanoic acid
  - 4-Methylpentanoic acid
- Esters with formula C_{6}H_{12}O_{2}:
  - Butyl acetate
  - sec-Butyl acetate
  - tert-Butyl acetate
  - Ethyl butyrate
  - Isobutyl acetate
  - Isoamyl formate
  - Methyl pentanoate
  - Methyl pivalate
  - Propyl propanoate
- Other organic compounds with formula C_{6}H_{12}O_{2}:
  - Cyclohexane-1,2-diol, a chemical compound found in castoreum
  - Diacetone alcohol
