= Pentyl propanoate =

- Pentyl propanoate

Names
- Preferred IUPAC name Pentyl propanoate
- Other names Pentyl propionate

Identifiers
CAS Number	624-54-4
3D model (JSmol)	Interactive image
ChemSpider	11716
ECHA InfoCard	100.009.866
PubChem CID	12217
UNII	826P0596UJ
CompTox Dashboard (EPA)	DTXSID4041606
- InChI: InChI=1S/C8H16O2/c1-3-5-6-7-10-8(9)4-2/h3-7H2,1-2H3 Key: TWSRVQVEYJNFKQ-UHFFFAOYSA-N; InChI=1/C8H16O2/c1-3-5-6-7-10-8(9)4-2/h3-7H2,1-2H3 Key: TWSRVQVEYJNFKQ-UHFFFAOYAA
- SMILES: O=C(OCCCCC)CC

Properties
Chemical formula	C_{8}H_{16}O_{2}
Molar mass	144.22 g/mol
Appearance	Sweet fruity odor of apricot pineapple
Density	0.870 g/cm^{3}
Melting point	−75 °C (−103 °F; 198 K)
Boiling point	168 °C (334 °F; 441 K)

Related compounds
Related Esters	Propyl propanoate Butyl propanoate Hexyl propanoate Pentyl acetate Pentyl butanoate
- Except where otherwise noted, data are given for materials in their standard state (at 25 °C [77 °F], 100 kPa). verify (what is ?) Infobox references

Pentyl propanoate (also known as amyl propionate) is an organic ester formed by the condensation of pentan-1-ol and propanoic acid. It is a colorless liquid with an apple-like odour or as sweet, fruity, apricot, pineapple, tropical, banana. Having a low density, it floats on water.
