= C9H18O2 =

The molecular formula C_{9}H_{18}O_{2} (molar mass: 158.24 g/mol) may refer to:

- Ethyl heptanoate
- Heptyl acetate
- Isoamyl butyrate
- Nonanoic acid
- Pentyl butyrate, or amyl butyrate
- Propyl hexanoate
