= C12H24O2 =

The molecular formula C_{12}H_{24}O_{2} (molar mass: 200.31 g/mol, exact mass: 200.1776 u) may refer to:

- Ethyl decanoate
- Lauric acid
- Hexyl hexanoate
- Propyl myristate
