= 1-Pentanethiol =

Organosulfur compound (C5H11SH)

Pentane-1-thiol

Names
- Preferred IUPAC name Pentane-1-thiol
- Other names 1-Pentanethiol; Pentyl mercaptan Amyl mercaptan n-Pentyl mercaptan n-Amyl mercaptan Thiopentyl alcohol Thioamyl alcohol Mercaptopentane n-Pentanethiol; 1-Mercaptopentane

Identifiers
CAS Number	110-66-7
3D model (JSmol)	Interactive image
Abbreviations	PeSH or n-PeSH
ChEBI	CHEBI:173322
ChemSpider	7776
ECHA InfoCard	100.003.446
EC Number	203-789-1
PubChem CID	8067
RTECS number	SA3150000
UNII	9A3YK965F3
UN number	1111
CompTox Dashboard (EPA)	DTXSID9041605
- InChI: InChI=1S/C5H12S/c1-2-3-4-5-6/h6H,2-5H2,1H3 Key: ZRKMQKLGEQPLNS-UHFFFAOYSA-N
- SMILES: SCCCCC

Properties
Chemical formula	C_{5}H_{12}S
Molar mass	104.21 g·mol^{−1}
Density	0.8421 g/cm^{3} (at 20 °C)
Melting point	−75.7 to −75.69 °C (−104.26 to −104.24 °F; 197.45 to 197.46 K)
Boiling point	126.6 °C (259.9 °F; 399.8 K)

Hazards
- GHS labelling
Pictograms	(GHS02: Flammable) (GHS07: Exclamation mark)
Signal word	Danger
Hazard statements	H225, H302, H332
Precautionary statements	P210, P233, P240, P241, P242, P243, P261, P264, P270, P271, P280, P301+P317, P303+P361+P353, P304+P340, P317, P330, P370+P378, P403+P235, P501
NFPA 704 (fire diamond)	2 3 0
Flash point	18 °C; 65 °F; 291 K
- Except where otherwise noted, data are given for materials in their standard state (at 25 °C [77 °F], 100 kPa). Infobox references

Pentane-1-thiol, also known as pentyl mercaptan or amyl mercaptan, is an organosulfur compound with the formula C_{5}H_{11}S or CH_{3}(CH_{2})_{4}SH. It is classified as a thiol.

1-pentanethiol is one of the main components of the odor of cigarette smoke.

== See also ==
- Pentan-1-ol
