= Lauric acid diethanolamide =

Names
- IUPAC name N,N-bis(2-hydroxyethyl)dodecanamide
- Other names: Lauric diethanolamide; Lauryl diethanolamide

Identifiers
CAS Number	120-40-1
3D model (JSmol)	Interactive image
ChEBI	CHEBI:143726
ChEMBL	ChEMBL1996872
ChemSpider	8123
ECHA InfoCard	100.003.994
EC Number	204-393-1
PubChem CID	8430
UNII	I29I2VHG38
CompTox Dashboard (EPA)	DTXSID5025491
- InChI: InChI=1S/C16H33NO3/c1-2-3-4-5-6-7-8-9-10-11-16(20)17(12-14-18)13-15-19/h18-19H,2-15H2,1H3 Key: AOMUHOFOVNGZAN-UHFFFAOYSA-N
- SMILES: CCCCCCCCCCCC(=O)N(CCO)CCO

Properties
Chemical formula	C_{16}H_{33}NO_{3}
Molar mass	287.444 g·mol^{−1}
Appearance	off-white solid
Density	0.97 g/cm^{3}
Melting point	38.7 °C (101.7 °F; 311.8 K)
Boiling point	239–244 °C; 462–471 °F; 512–517 K
Solubility in water	insoluble
Solubility	soluble in lower alcohols, propylene glycol, polyethylene glycols
Vapor pressure	0.00000001 mmHg

Hazards
- GHS labelling
Pictograms	(GHS05: Corrosive) (GHS07: Exclamation mark) (GHS09: Environmental hazard)
Signal word	Danger
Hazard statements	H315, H318, H411
Precautionary statements	P264, P264+P265, P273, P280, P302+P352, P305+P354+P338, P317, P321, P332+P317, P362+P364, P391, P501
- Except where otherwise noted, data are given for materials in their standard state (at 25 °C [77 °F], 100 kPa). Infobox references

Lauric acid diethanolamide is a chemical compound belonging to the group of carboxylic acid amides and, at 48.2%, is the main component of cocamide diethanolamine.

== Synthesis ==
Lauric acid diethanolamide is produced by reacting lauric acid or lauric acid methyl ester with diethanolamine under alkaline solution conditions.

== Application ==
Lauric acid diethanolamide is used as an ingredient in cosmetic and personal care products. The compound functions as an antistatic agent, increases viscosity, and, in combination with other surfactants, improves foam texture in shampoos and bubble baths as an emulsifier and foaming agent. In mixtures with other emulsifiers such as sodium lauryl sulphate, amphoteric surfactants, and anionic surfactants, lauric acid diethanolamide can also be used as a cleaning and dispersing agent for oils and pesticides.
