= Fatty acid methyl ester =

Class of chemical compounds

Fatty acid methyl esters (FAME) are a type of fatty acid ester that are derived by transesterification of fats with methanol. The molecules in biodiesel are primarily FAME, usually obtained from vegetable oils by transesterification. They are used to produce detergents and biodiesel. FAME are typically produced by an alkali-catalyzed reaction between fats and methanol in the presence of base such as sodium hydroxide, sodium methoxide or potassium hydroxide. One reason for using FAME (fatty acid methyl esters) in biodiesel production, rather than free fatty acids, is to mitigate the potential corrosion they can cause to metals of engines, production facilities, and related infrastructure. While free fatty acids are only mildly acidic, over time they can lead to cumulative corrosion. In contrast, their esters, such as FAME, are less corrosive and therefore preferred for biodiesel production. As an improved quality, FAMEs also usually have about 12-15 units higher cetane number than their unesterified counterparts.

== Selected FAMEs ==
FAMEs are colorless compounds with melting points near room temperature.

Selected FAMEs
FAME	Formula	Registry number	Refractive index	Density (g/cm^{3})	Melting point (°C)	Boiling point (°C)
Methyl laurate	CH_{3}(CH_{2})_{10}CO_{2}CH_{3}	111-82-0	1.4301	0.8702	5.2	267
Methyl myristate	CH_{3}(CH_{2})_{12}CO_{2}CH_{3}	124-10-7	-	0.8671	17.8	295
Methyl palmitate	CH_{3}(CH_{2})_{14}CO_{2}CH_{3}	112-39-0	1.4310	-	29.5	417
Methyl stearate	CH_{3}(CH_{2})_{16}CO_{2}CH_{3}	112-61-8	1.45740	0.83	40	443
Methyl oleate	CH_{3}(CH_{2})_{6}CH=CH(CH_{2})_{5}CO_{2}CH_{3}	112-62-9	-	0.8739	-19.9	-

== FAME profiling ==
Microorganisms have diverse and sometimes distinctive FAME profiles, the basis of "microbial fingerprinting". After triglycerides, fatty acids and certain other lipids of some cultured microbes are transesterified or esterified, the resulting FAMEs can be analyzed with gas chromatography. These profiles can be used as a tool for microbial source tracking (MST) to identify pathological bacteria strains and for characterizing new species of bacteria.

For example, a profile created from cultured bacteria from some water sample can be compared to a profile of known pathological bacteria to find out if the water is polluted by feces or not.

== Unusual FAMEs ==
In June 2022, polycyclopropanated fatty acid methyl ester (POP-FAME) fuels were biosynthesized from Streptomyces coelicolor bacteria, which have energy densities of more than 50MJ/L larger than the most widely used aviation and rocket fuels.

== See also ==
- Biodiesel production
- Oleochemicals
