= Pentyl hexanoate =

- Pentyl hexanoate

Names
- Preferred IUPAC name Pentyl hexanoate

Identifiers
CAS Number	540-07-8
3D model (JSmol)	Interactive image
ChemSpider	10424
ECHA InfoCard	100.007.940
PubChem CID	10886
UNII	5M61M1AL1H
CompTox Dashboard (EPA)	DTXSID0047581
- InChI: InChI=1S/C11H22O2/c1-3-5-7-9-11(12)13-10-8-6-4-2/h3-10H2,1-2H3 Key: WRFZKAGPPQGDDQ-UHFFFAOYSA-N; InChI=1/C11H22O2/c1-3-5-7-9-11(12)13-10-8-6-4-2/h3-10H2,1-2H3 Key: WRFZKAGPPQGDDQ-UHFFFAOYAW
- SMILES: CCCCCC(=O)OCCCCC

Properties
Chemical formula	C_{11}H_{22}O_{2}
Molar mass	186.295 g·mol^{−1}
Density	0.858 g/mL
Boiling point	226 °C (439 °F; 499 K)
- Except where otherwise noted, data are given for materials in their standard state (at 25 °C [77 °F], 100 kPa). Infobox references

Pentyl hexanoate (C_{5}H_{11}COOC_{5}H_{11}) is an ester found in apple and pineapple fruits. Its aroma is described as sweet, fruity, apple, melon. It is closely related to pentyl butyrate and pentyl pentanoate, both of which are also present in fruits.
