= Carboalkoxylation =

Process for converting alkenes to esters

In industrial chemistry, carboalkoxylation is a process for converting alkenes to esters. This reaction is a form of carbonylation. A closely related reaction is hydrocarboxylation, which employs water in place of alcohols.

A commercial application is the carbomethoxylation of ethylene to give methyl propionate:

C_{2}H_{4} + CO + MeOH → MeO_{2}CC_{2}H_{5}

The process is catalyzed by Pd[C_{6}H_{4}(CH_{2}PBu-t)_{2}]_{2}. Under similar conditions, other Pd-diphosphines catalyze formation of polyethyleneketone.

Methyl propionate ester is a precursor to methyl methacrylate, which is used in plastics and adhesives.

Carboalkoxylation has been incorporated into various telomerization schemes. For example carboalkoxylation has been coupled with the dimerization of 1,3-butadiene. This step produces a doubly unsaturated C9-ester:

2 CH_{2}=CH−CH=CH_{2} + CO + CH_{3}OH → CH_{2}=CH(CH_{2})_{3}CH=CHCH_{2}CO_{2}CH_{3}

== Hydroesterification ==
Related to carboalkoxylation is hydroesterification, the insertion of alkenes and alkynes into the H-O bond of carboxylic acids. Vinyl acetate is produced industrially by the addition of acetic acid to acetylene in the presence of zinc acetate catalysts: Presently, zinc acetate is used as the catalyst:

CH_{3}CO_{2}H + C_{2}H_{2} → CH_{3}CO_{2}CHCH_{2}
