= Methyl hexanoate =

Methyl ester

Names
- Preferred IUPAC name Methyl hexanoate
- Other names: Methyl caproate; Methyl hexanate

Identifiers
CAS Number	106-70-7
3D model (JSmol)	Interactive image
Beilstein Reference	1744683
ChEBI	CHEBI:77322
ChemSpider	7536
ECHA InfoCard	100.003.115
EC Number	203-425-1
PubChem CID	7824
UNII	246364VPJS
UN number	1993
CompTox Dashboard (EPA)	DTXSID0047616
- InChI: InChI=1S/C7H14O2/c1-3-4-5-6-7(8)9-2/h3-6H2,1-2H3 Key: NUKZAGXMHTUAFE-UHFFFAOYSA-N
- SMILES: CCCCCC(=O)OC

Properties
Chemical formula	C_{7}H_{14}O_{2}
Molar mass	130.187 g·mol^{−1}
Density	0.8846
Melting point	−71.0 °C (−95.8 °F; 202.2 K)
Boiling point	149.5 °C (301.1 °F; 422.6 K)
Solubility in water	1.33 mg/mL at 20 °C
Solubility	ethanol
Refractive index (n_{D})	1.4049

Related compounds
Related compounds	Ethyl hexanoate, Propyl hexanoate, Butyl hexanoate Allyl hexanoate

Hazards
- GHS labelling
Pictograms	(GHS02: Flammable)
Signal word	Warning
Hazard statements	H226
Precautionary statements	P210, P233, P240, P241, P242, P243, P280, P303+P361+P353, P370+P378, P403+P235, P501
Flash point	73 °C; 163 °F; 346 K
- Except where otherwise noted, data are given for materials in their standard state (at 25 °C [77 °F], 100 kPa). Infobox references

Methyl hexanoate is the fatty acid methyl ester of hexanoic acid (caproic acid), a colourless liquid organic compound with the chemical formula CH_{3}−(CH_{2})_{4}−COO−CH_{3}. It is found naturally in many foods and has a role as a plant metabolite. It can also be found in the cytoplasm of cells.

Methyl hexanoate is produced industrially for use as a flavouring agent. It can also be used as fragrance for a pineapple smell.

== Production ==
Methyl hexanoate is produced in multi-tonne quantities for use as a flavouring agent. It is made by combining methanol with hexanoic acid.

== Uses ==
Methyl hexanoate is found naturally in foods like potatoes, tomatoes and cheese and is a constituent of some alcoholic beverages. It can be used to mimic the flavor of pineapple like its related ester ethyl hexanoate.

== Safety ==
The LD_{50} for rats is more than 5 g/kg, indicating low toxicity. When heated to decomposition, methyl hexanoate emits toxic fumes. It can cause burns.

=== Flammability ===
Methyl hexanoate is flammable. It has a flash point of 163 °F (73 °C).

== See also ==
- Ethyl hexanoate
- Propyl hexanoate
