= Isoamyl formate =

Chemical compound with plum odor

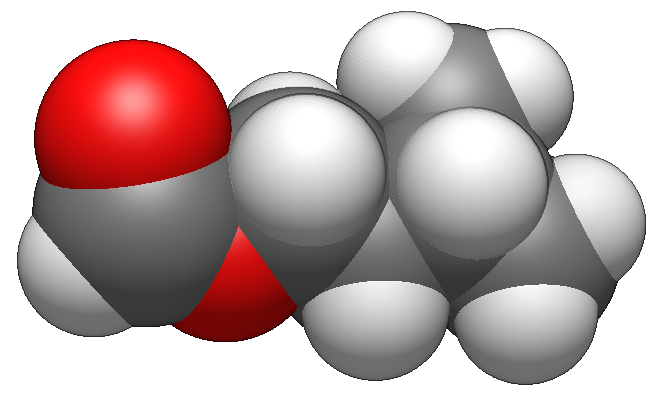

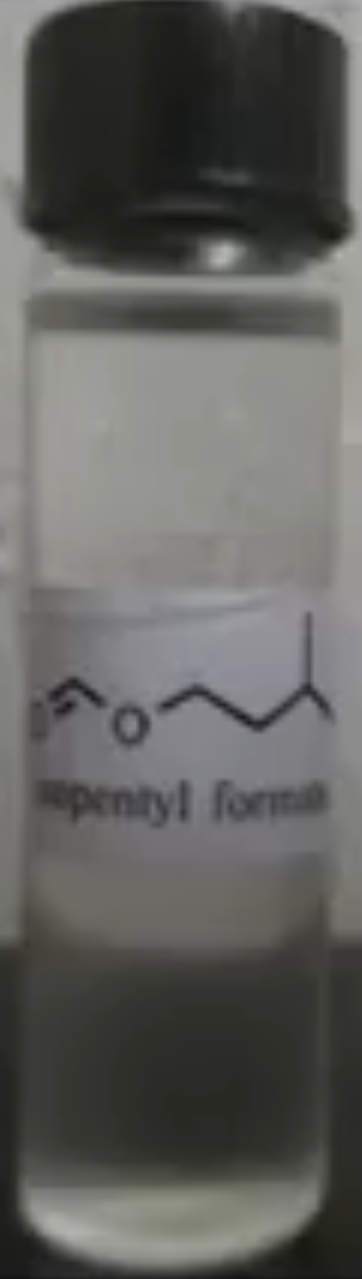

Names
- Preferred IUPAC name 3-Methylbutyl formate
- Systematic IUPAC name 3-Methylbutyl formate
- Other names Isopentyl formate Isopentyl methanoate Isoamyl formate

Identifiers
CAS Number	110-45-2
3D model (JSmol)	Interactive image
Beilstein Reference	1739893
ChEBI	CHEBI:31726
ChEMBL	ChEMBL42013
ChemSpider	7761
ECHA InfoCard	100.003.428
EC Number	203-769-2
KEGG	C12293
PubChem CID	8052
UNII	50L53EN043
CompTox Dashboard (EPA)	DTXSID00861734
- InChI: InChI=1S/C6H12O2/c1-6(2)3-4-8-5-7/h5-6H,3-4H2,1-2H3 Key: XKYICAQFSCFURC-UHFFFAOYSA-N
- SMILES: CC(C)CCOC=O

Properties
Chemical formula	C_{6}H_{12}O_{2}
Molar mass	116.160 g·mol^{−1}
Appearance	Colorless liquid
Odor	fruity (plum, blackcurrant)
Density	0.881−0.889 g/cm^{3}
Melting point	−93.5 °C (−136.3 °F; 179.7 K)
Boiling point	123.00 to 124.00 °C (253.40 to 255.20 °F; 396.15 to 397.15 K)
Solubility in water	3.5 g/L at 25 °C
Solubility	soluble in ethanol, most fixed oils and propylene glycol; insoluble in glycerol
Vapor pressure	9.97 mmHg (20 °C); 13.4 mmHg (25 °C)
Refractive index (n_{D})	1.396−1.400

Hazards
- GHS labelling
Pictograms	(GHS02: Flammable) (GHS07: Exclamation mark)
Signal word	Danger
Hazard statements	H225, H319, H335
Precautionary statements	P210, P233, P240, P241, P242, P243, P261, P264+P265, P271, P280, P303+P361+P353, P304+P340, P305+P351+P338, P319, P337+P317, P370+P378, P403+P233, P403+P235, P405, P501
Flash point	27 °C
- Lethal dose or concentration (LD, LC)
LD_{50} (median dose)	9840 mg/kg (oral, rat); 3020 mg/kg (oral, rabbit); >5 g/kg (dermal, rabbit)

Related compounds
Related compounds	Isoamyl acetate Isobutyl formate
- Except where otherwise noted, data are given for materials in their standard state (at 25 °C [77 °F], 100 kPa). Infobox references

Isoamyl formate, also known as isopentyl formate, is an ester formed from isoamyl alcohol and formic acid, with the formula C_{6}H_{12}O_{2}. It is a colorless liquid with a fruity odor of plum or blackcurrant.

== Natural occurrence ==
Isoamyl formate is found in nature in the plant Plectranthus glabratus. It occurs in the following foods and drinks: avocado, beer, cheese, grape brandy, honey, pineapple, Mangifera (a plant genus including mangos), plum, quince, cider, rum, sea buckthorn, strawberry, tea, tequila, vinegar, and wine.

== Preparation ==
Isoamyl formate may be prepared by the Fischer esterification of isoamyl alcohol and formic acid. Fischer esterifications of formic acid use an excess of formic acid as the solvent, and formic acid is a strong enough acid to self-catalyze the reaction without any other acid catalyst added.

== Uses ==
Isoamyl formate is used as an aroma compound and artificial flavoring, for its odor of plum or blackcurrant.

== Safety ==
Isoamyl formate has not been shown to be mutagenic or genotoxic in tests such as the Ames test.
