= Ethyl octanoate =

Names
- Preferred IUPAC name Ethyl octanoate
- Other names Ethyl caprylate

Identifiers
CAS Number	106-32-1
3D model (JSmol)	Interactive image
ChemSpider	7511
ECHA InfoCard	100.003.078
EC Number	203-385-5
PubChem CID	7799
RTECS number	RH0680000
UNII	81C5MOP582
CompTox Dashboard (EPA)	DTXSID8051542
- InChI: InChI=1S/C10H20O2/c1-3-5-6-7-8-9-10(11)12-4-2/h3-9H2,1-2H3 Key: YYZUSRORWSJGET-UHFFFAOYSA-N
- SMILES: O=C(OCC)CCCCCCC

Properties
Chemical formula	C_{10}H_{20}O_{2}
Molar mass	172.268 g·mol^{−1}
Density	0.86215 g/cm^{3}
Melting point	−48 °C (−54 °F; 225 K)
Boiling point	208 °C (406 °F; 481 K)
Solubility in water	70.1 mg/L
Vapor pressure	0.2 mbar at 20 °C; 3.18 mbar at 60 °C
Viscosity	1.411 mPa·s

Hazards
Flash point	79 °C (174 °F; 352 K)
Autoignition temperature	325 °C (617 °F; 598 K)
Explosive limits	0.7 - Vol.%
- Lethal dose or concentration (LD, LC)
LD_{50} (median dose)	25.96 g/kg (rat, oral)
- Except where otherwise noted, data are given for materials in their standard state (at 25 °C [77 °F], 100 kPa). Infobox references

Ethyl octanoate, also known as ethyl caprylate, is a fatty acid ester formed from caprylic acid and ethanol. A colorless liquid at room temperature, it has the semi-developed formula of CH_{3}(CH_{2})_{6}COOCH_{2}CH_{3}, and is used in food industries as a flavoring and in the perfume industry as a scent additive. It is present in many fruits and alcoholic beverages, and has a strong odor of fruit and flowers.

== Synthesis ==
Ethyl octanoate can be synthesized from caprylic acid and ethanol via a classic Fischer–Speier esterification.

CH_{3}(CH_{2})_{6}COOH + CH_{3}CH_{2}OH ⇌ CH_{3}(CH_{2})_{6}COOCH_{2}CH_{3} + H_{2}O

Equilibrium can be shifted towards the right side of the equation through removal of water.

== Uses and occurrence ==
Ethyl octanoate does not see widespread use due to the greater availability of reasonably similar esters such as ethyl acetate. However, there are certain applications where it fills a niche. Ethyl octanoate has a strong odor of fruit and flowers and a taste of apricot, and as such it can be used as a flavoring or to create scents. It sees some use as a cleaning agent.

Ethyl octanoate is used in the creation of synthetic fruity scents. It occurs above the odor threshold in young red wines. In some wines, overall ester concentration and composition is considered important to the flavor and aroma profile.

== Safety ==
Like many esters, ethyl octanoate is not considered to be toxic. LD50 in rats is 25.96 g/kg. Though it has a low explosive limit of only 0.67 vol%, it is also weakly volatile, with a vapor pressure of only 0.2 mbar at room temperature and therefore unable to create an explosive atmosphere at room temperature. Ethyl octanoate is combustible.
