= Ethyl propionate =

Skeletal formula of ethyl propionate
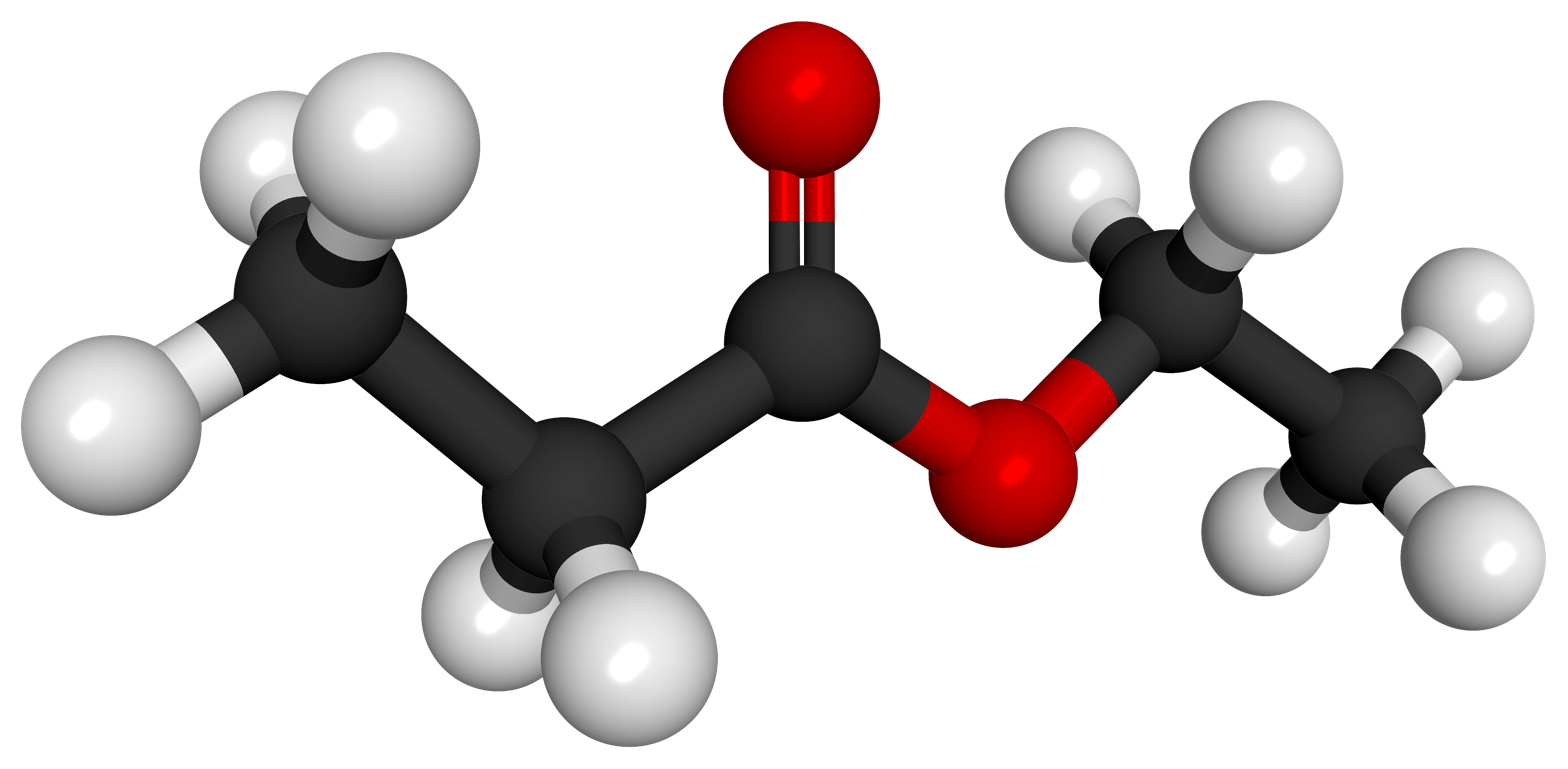
Ball-and-stick model of ethyl propionate
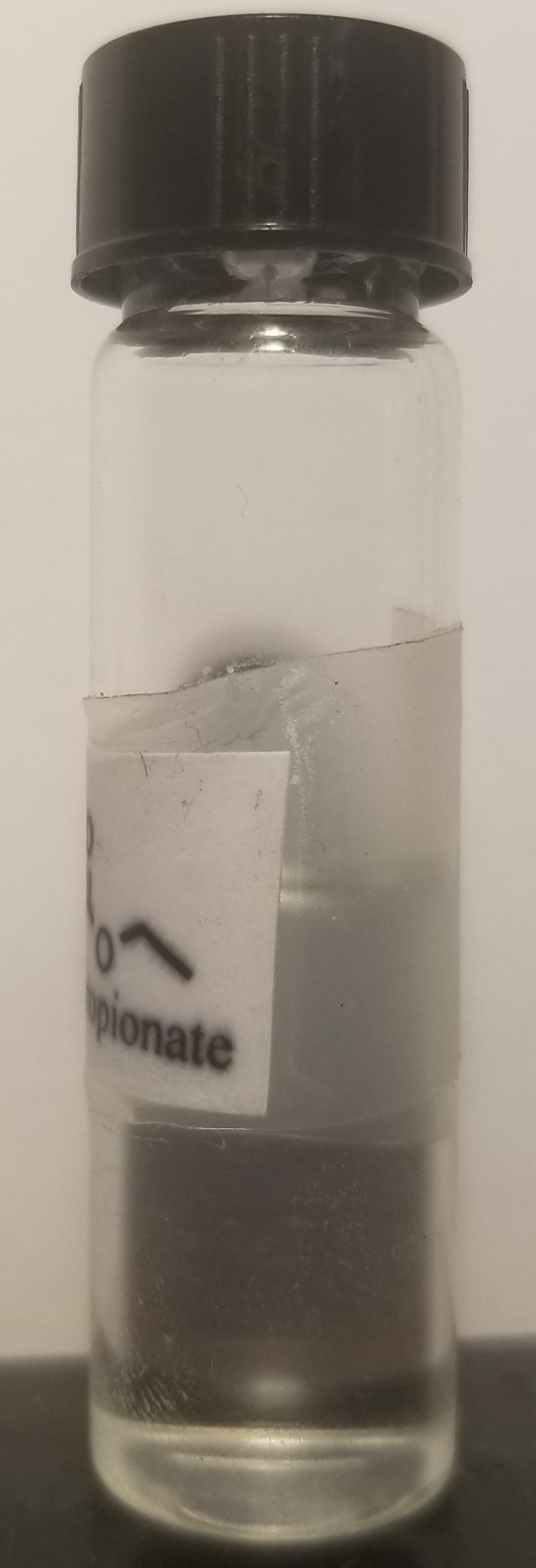

Names
- Preferred IUPAC name Ethyl propanoate
- Other names: Ethyl propionate; n-Ethyl propanoate; Propanoic acid ethyl ester

Identifiers
CAS Number	105-37-3
3D model (JSmol)	Interactive image
Beilstein Reference	506287
ChemSpider	7463
ECHA InfoCard	100.002.993
EC Number	203-291-4
PubChem CID	7749
RTECS number	UF3675000
UNII	AT9K8FY49U
UN number	N119
CompTox Dashboard (EPA)	DTXSID1040110
- InChI: InChI=1/C5H10O2/c1-3-5(6)7-4-2/h3-4H2,1-2H3
- SMILES: CCOC(=O)CC

Properties
Chemical formula	C_{5}H_{10}O_{2}
Molar mass	102.133 g·mol^{−1}
Appearance	Colorless Liquid
Density	0.884325 g/cm^{3}
Melting point	−73.6 °C (−100.5 °F; 199.6 K)
Boiling point	98.9 °C (210.0 °F; 372.0 K)
Magnetic susceptibility (χ)	−66.5·10^{−6} cm^{3}/mol

Hazards
- GHS labelling
Pictograms	(GHS02: Flammable)
Signal word	Danger
Hazard statements	H225
Precautionary statements	P403+P235
NFPA 704 (fire diamond)	2 2 0
Flash point	12 °C (54 °F; 285 K)
Autoignition temperature	440 °C (824 °F; 713 K)
Explosive limits	1.9-11 %
- Safety data sheet (SDS)
- Except where otherwise noted, data are given for materials in their standard state (at 25 °C [77 °F], 100 kPa). Infobox references

Ethyl propionate is an organic compound with formula C_{2}H_{5}O_{2}CCH_{2}CH_{3}. It is the ethyl ester of propionic acid. It is a colorless volatile liquid with a pineapple-like odour (sweet, fruity, rummy, juicy, grape, pineapple). Some fruits such as kiwis and strawberries contain ethyl propionate in small amounts.

== Uses and reactions ==
It is used in the production of some antimalarial drugs including pyrimethamine.

Ethyl propionate can be synthesized by the Fischer esterification of ethanol and propionic acid:

CH_{3}CH_{2}OH + CH_{3}CH_{2}CO_{2}H → CH_{3}CH_{2}O_{2}CCH_{2}CH_{3} + H_{2}O

It participates in condensation reactions by virtue of the weakly acidic methylene group.

== See also ==
- Methyl propionate, a similar compound
