= Isopropyl salicylate =

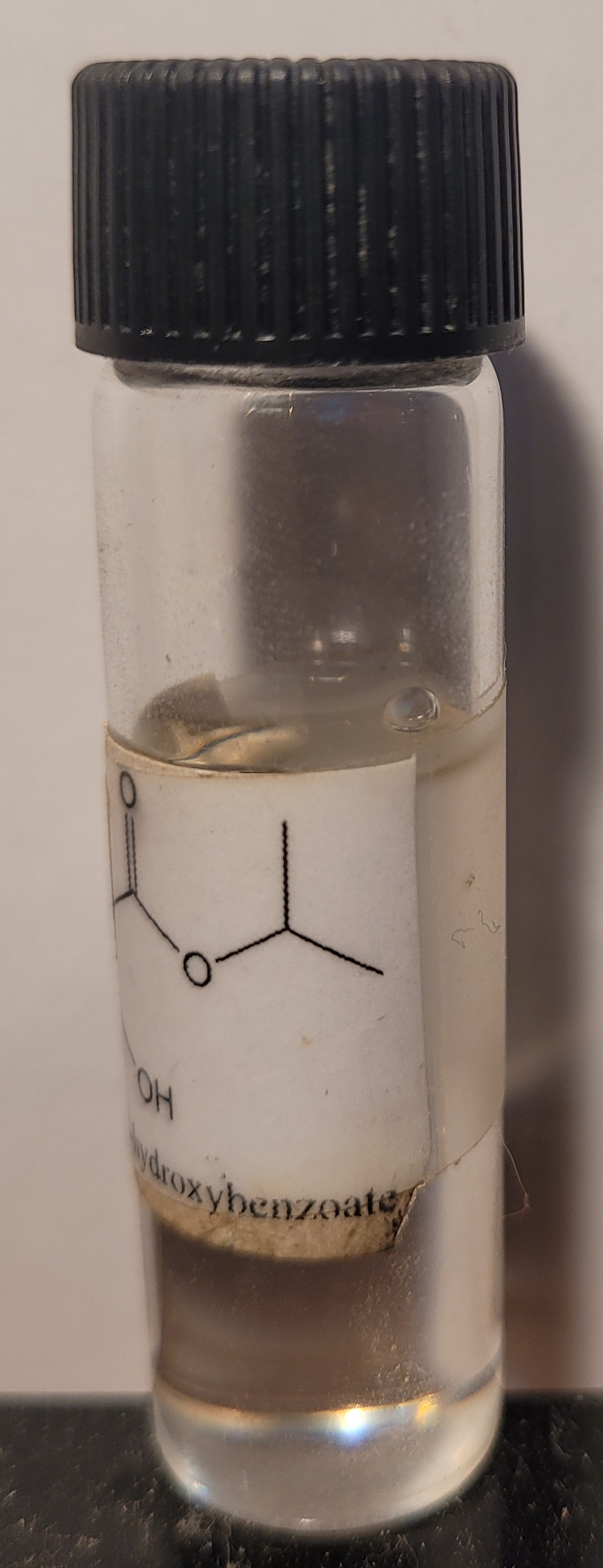

Names
- Preferred IUPAC name Propan-2-yl 2-hydroxybenzoate

Identifiers
CAS Number	607-85-2
3D model (JSmol)	Interactive image
Beilstein Reference	2615569
ChEBI	CHEBI:38703
ChemSpider	11345
ECHA InfoCard	100.009.222
EC Number	210-143-2
PubChem CID	11838
UNII	B2265SZU9K
CompTox Dashboard (EPA)	DTXSID1060556
- InChI: InChI=1S/C10H12O3/c1-7(2)13-10(12)8-5-3-4-6-9(8)11/h3-7,11H,1-2H3 Key: YEULQIJMIOWCHB-UHFFFAOYSA-N
- SMILES: CC(C)OC(=O)C1=CC=CC=C1O

Properties
Chemical formula	C_{10}H_{12}O_{3}
Molar mass	180.203 g·mol^{−1}
Appearance	Colorless liquid
Odor	vegetal
Density	1.09 g/cm^{3}
Boiling point	238.0 °C (460.4 °F; 511.1 K)

Hazards
- GHS labelling
Pictograms	(GHS09: Environmental hazard)
Signal word	Warning
Hazard statements	H411
Precautionary statements	P273, P391, P501
- Except where otherwise noted, data are given for materials in their standard state (at 25 °C [77 °F], 100 kPa). verify (what is ?) Infobox references

Isopropyl salicylate is the ester formed by the condensation of salicylic acid and isopropyl alcohol. It is a transparent liquid that is sparingly soluble in water. However, it is soluble in ethyl alcohol and ether. It is aromatic with an odour described as "cortex, clover, orchid".

== See also ==
- Methyl salicylate
- Ethyl salicylate
