= Ethyl decanoate =

Names
- Preferred IUPAC name Ethyl decanoate
- Other names Decanoic acid ethyl ester Ethyl caprate Ethyl caprinate Ethyl decylate Capric acid ethyl ester

Identifiers
CAS Number	110-38-3
3D model (JSmol)	Interactive image
ChemSpider	7757
ECHA InfoCard	100.003.421
PubChem CID	8048
UNII	GY39FB86UO
CompTox Dashboard (EPA)	DTXSID0044363
- InChI: InChI=1S/C12H24O2/c1-3-5-6-7-8-9-10-11-12(13)14-4-2/h3-11H2,1-2H3 Key: RGXWDWUGBIJHDO-UHFFFAOYSA-N; InChI=1/C12H24O2/c1-3-5-6-7-8-9-10-11-12(13)14-4-2/h3-11H2,1-2H3 Key: RGXWDWUGBIJHDO-UHFFFAOYAS
- SMILES: O=C(OCC)CCCCCCCCC

Properties
Chemical formula	C_{12}H_{24}O_{2}
Molar mass	200.322 g·mol^{−1}
Density	0.862 g/cm^{3}
Melting point	−26 °C (−15 °F; 247 K)
Boiling point	245 °C (473 °F; 518 K)
- Except where otherwise noted, data are given for materials in their standard state (at 25 °C [77 °F], 100 kPa). Infobox references

Ethyl decanoate, also known as ethyl caprate, is a fatty acid ester formed from capric acid and ethanol. This ester is a frequent product of fermentation during winemaking, especially at temperatures above 15 °C (59 °F). This ester has a waxy (sweet, waxy, fruity, apple, grape, oily, brandy) aroma.
