= Bornyl acetate =

Names
- Preferred IUPAC name 1,7,7-Trimethylbicyclo[2.2.1]heptan-2-yl acetate

Identifiers
CAS Number	76-49-3; (1S,2R,4S)-(-): 5655-61-8; (1R,2S,4R)-(+): 20347-65-3
3D model (JSmol)	Interactive image
ChEBI	(1S,2R,4S)-(-): CHEBI:157; (1R,2S,4R)-(+): CHEBI:3151
ChEMBL	(1S,2R,4S)-(-): ChEMBL3183823
ChemSpider	83962
ECHA InfoCard	100.000.878
EC Number	200-964-4
KEGG	(1S,2R,4S)-(-): C09837; (1R,2S,4R)-(+): C11338
PubChem CID	6448; (1S,2R,4S)-(-): 12025
RTECS number	NP7350000
UNII	213431586X; (1S,2R,4S)-(-): 24QAP1VCUX; (1R,2S,4R)-(+): MN65CC8L89
CompTox Dashboard (EPA)	DTXSID80859098 DTXSID7041675, DTXSID80859098
- InChI: InChI=1S/C12H20O2/c1-8(13)14-10-7-9-5-6-12(10,4)11(9,2)3/h9-10H,5-7H2,1-4H3 Key: KGEKLUUHTZCSIP-UHFFFAOYSA-N
- SMILES: CC(=O)OC1CC2CCC1(C2(C)C)C

Properties
Chemical formula	C_{12}H_{20}O_{2}
Molar mass	196.290 g·mol^{−1}
Melting point	27–29 °C
Boiling point	223–224 °C
- Except where otherwise noted, data are given for materials in their standard state (at 25 °C [77 °F], 100 kPa). Infobox references

Bornyl acetate is an organic compound with the formula C_{10}H_{17}O_{2}CCH_{3}. It is the acetate ester of the terpenoid borneol. It is chiral, and the (-) enantiomer is used as a food additive, flavouring agent, and odour agent. It is found in valerian.

It is a component of the essential oil from pine needles (from the family Pinaceae) and primarily responsible for its woody, pine, herbal, cedar, spicy, camphoreous, mentholic odour.
