= 1-Pentanol =

- Skeletal formula of 1-pentanol

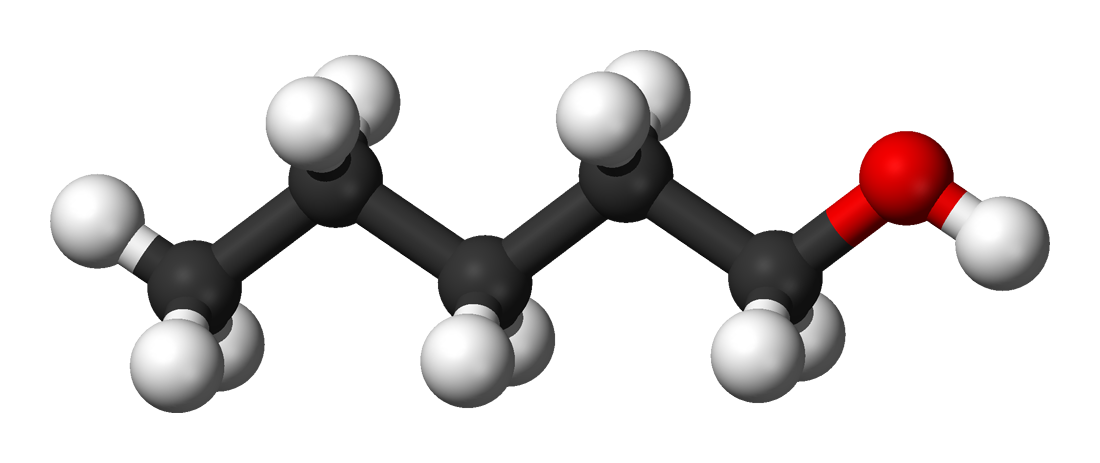
- Ball and stick model of 1-pentanol

Names
- Preferred IUPAC name Pentan-1-ol

Identifiers
CAS Number	71-41-0
3D model (JSmol)	Interactive image
Abbreviations	PeOH n-PeOH nPeOH^{n}PeOH; AmOH n-AmOH nAmOH^{n}AmOH
Beilstein Reference	1730975
ChEBI	CHEBI:44884
ChEMBL	ChEMBL14568
ChemSpider	6040
ECHA InfoCard	100.000.684
EC Number	200-752-1
Gmelin Reference	25922
KEGG	C16834
MeSH	n-Pentanol
PubChem CID	6276
RTECS number	SB9800000
UNII	M9L931X26Y
UN number	1105
CompTox Dashboard (EPA)	DTXSID6021741
- InChI: InChI=1S/C5H12O/c1-2-3-4-5-6/h6H,2-5H2,1H3 Key: AMQJEAYHLZJPGS-UHFFFAOYSA-N
- SMILES: CCCCCO

Properties
Chemical formula	C_{5}H_{12}O
Molar mass	88.150 g·mol^{−1}
Density	0.811 g cm^{−3}
Melting point	−78 °C; −109 °F; 195 K
Boiling point	137 to 139 °C; 278 to 282 °F; 410 to 412 K
Solubility in water	22 g L^{−1}
log P	1.348
Vapor pressure	200 Pa (at 20 °C)
Magnetic susceptibility (χ)	−67.7·10^{−6} cm^{3}/mol
Refractive index (n_{D})	1.409

Thermochemistry
Heat capacity (C)	207.45 J K^{−1} mol^{−1}
Std molar entropy (S^{⦵}_{298})	258.9 J K^{−1} mol^{−1}
Std enthalpy of formation (Δ_{f}H^{⦵}_{298})	−351.90–−351.34 kJ mol^{−1}
Std enthalpy of combustion (Δ_{c}H^{⦵}_{298})	−3331.19–−3330.63 kJ mol^{−1}

Hazards
- GHS labelling
Pictograms	(GHS02: Flammable) (GHS07: Exclamation mark)
Signal word	Warning
Hazard statements	H226, H315, H332, H335
Precautionary statements	P261
NFPA 704 (fire diamond)	1 2 0
Flash point	49 °C (120 °F; 322 K)
Autoignition temperature	300 °C (572 °F; 573 K)

Related compounds
Related compounds	Hexane Pentylamine
- Except where otherwise noted, data are given for materials in their standard state (at 25 °C [77 °F], 100 kPa). verify (what is ?) Infobox references

1-Pentanol, (or n-pentanol, pentan-1-ol), is an organic compound with the formula CH_{3}(CH_{2})_{4}OH and is classified as a primary alcohol. It is a colourless liquid with a distinctive aroma. It is one of 8 isomeric alcohols with the formula C_{5}H_{11}OH. It is used as a solvent, a biological drying agent and in the synthesis of some fragrance compounds. It is also a common component of fusel alcohols (fusel oils), the undesirable byproducts of alcoholic fermentation.

== Preparation ==
1-Pentanol is prepared from 1-butene by hydroformylation followed by hydrogenation of the resulting pentanal.

CH_{3}CH_{2}CH=CH_{2} + CO + H_{2} → CH_{3}CH_{2}CH_{2}CH_{2}CHO
CH_{3}CH_{2}CH_{2}CH_{2}CHO + H_{2} → CH_{3}CH_{2}CH_{2}CH_{2}CH_{2}OH

Pentanol can be prepared by fractional distillation of fusel oil. To reduce the use of fossil fuels, research is underway to develop cost-effective methods of producing (chemically identical) bio-pentanol with fermentation.

== Uses and occurrence ==
The hydroxyl group (OH) is the active site of many reactions. The ester formed from 1-pentanol and butyric acid is pentyl butyrate, which has an apricot-like odor. The ester formed from 1-pentanol and acetic acid is amyl acetate (also called pentyl acetate), which has a banana-like odor.

It is a precursor to dipentyl zinc dithiophosphates, which are used in froth flotation.

In 2014, a study was conducted comparing the performance of diesel fuel blends with various proportions of pentanol as an additive. While gaseous emissions increased with higher concentrations of pentanol, particulate emissions decreased.

Pentanol is often used as a solvent.
