= Benzyl acetate =

Names
- Preferred IUPAC name Benzyl acetate
- Other names Acetic acid phenylmethyl ester

Identifiers
CAS Number	140-11-4
3D model (JSmol)	Interactive image; Interactive image
ChEBI	CHEBI:52051
ChemSpider	13850405
ECHA InfoCard	100.004.909
KEGG	C15513
PubChem CID	8785
UNII	0ECG3V79ZJ
CompTox Dashboard (EPA)	DTXSID0020151
- InChI: InChI=1S/C9H10O2/c1-8(10)11-7-9-5-3-2-4-6-9/h2-6H,7H2,1H3 Key: QUKGYYKBILRGFE-UHFFFAOYSA-N; InChI=1/C9H10O2/c1-8(10)11-7-9-5-3-2-4-6-9/h2-6H,7H2,1H3 Key: QUKGYYKBILRGFE-UHFFFAOYAD
- SMILES: c1ccccc1COC(=O)C; CC(=O)OCc1ccccc1

Properties
Chemical formula	C_{9}H_{10}O_{2}
Molar mass	150.177 g·mol^{−1}
Appearance	Colourless liquid
Odor	floral
Density	1.054 g/ml
Melting point	−51.5 °C (−60.7 °F; 221.7 K)
Boiling point	212 °C (414 °F; 485 K)
Solubility in water	0.31 g/100 mL
Solubility	Soluble in benzene, chloroform Miscible with ethanol, ether, acetone
Magnetic susceptibility (χ)	−93.18·10^{−6} cm^{3}/mol
Refractive index (n_{D})	1.523

Hazards
- GHS labelling
Hazard statements	H412
Precautionary statements	P273, P501
NFPA 704 (fire diamond)	1 1 0
Flash point	102 °C (216 °F; 375 K)
Autoignition temperature	461 °C (862 °F; 734 K)
- Except where otherwise noted, data are given for materials in their standard state (at 25 °C [77 °F], 100 kPa). verify (what is ?) Infobox references

Benzyl acetate is an organic ester with the molecular formula CH_{3}C(O)OCH_{2}C_{6}H_{5}. It is formed by the condensation of benzyl alcohol and acetic acid.

Similar to most other esters, it possesses a sweet and pleasant aroma, owing to which, it finds applications in personal hygiene and health care products. It is a constituent of jasmin and of the essential oils of ylang-ylang and neroli. It has pleasant sweet aroma reminiscent of jasmine (sweet, floral, fruity, jasmin, fresh). Further as a flavoring agent it is also used to impart jasmine or apple flavors to various cosmetics and personal care products like lotions, hair creams etc..

It is one of many compounds that is attractive to males of various species of orchid bees. It is collected and used by the bees as an intra-specific pheromone; In apiculture benzyl acetate is used as a bait to collect bees. Natural sources of benzyl acetate include varieties of flowers like jasmine (Jasminum), and fruits like pear, apple, etc.
