= Isopropyl palmitate =

Names
- Preferred IUPAC name Propan-2-yl hexadecanoate
- Other names: Isopropyl hexadecanoatel; Hexadecanoic acid isopropyl ester; Hexadecanoic acid; 1-methylethyl ester

Identifiers
CAS Number	142-91-6
3D model (JSmol)	Interactive image
ChEBI	CHEBI:84262
ChEMBL	ChEMBL139055
ChemSpider	8567
ECHA InfoCard	100.005.065
KEGG	D04632
PubChem CID	8907
UNII	8CRQ2TH63M
CompTox Dashboard (EPA)	DTXSID9027104
- InChI: InChI=1S/C19H38O2/c1-4-5-6-7-8-9-10-11-12-13-14-15-16-17-19(20)21-18(2)3/h18H,4-17H2,1-3H3 Key: XUGNVMKQXJXZCD-UHFFFAOYSA-N; InChI=1/C19H38O2/c1-4-5-6-7-8-9-10-11-12-13-14-15-16-17-19(20)21-18(2)3/h18H,4-17H2,1-3H3 Key: XUGNVMKQXJXZCD-UHFFFAOYAX
- SMILES: O=C(OC(C)C)CCCCCCCCCCCCCCC

Properties
Chemical formula	C_{19}H_{38}O_{2}
Molar mass	298.511 g·mol^{−1}
Density	0.8525 g/cm^{3}
Melting point	13.5 °C (56.3 °F; 286.6 K)
Solubility in water	Insoluble

Hazards
NFPA 704 (fire diamond)	0 1 0
- Except where otherwise noted, data are given for materials in their standard state (at 25 °C [77 °F], 100 kPa). verify (what is ?) Infobox references

Isopropyl palmitate is the ester of isopropyl alcohol and palmitic acid. It is an emollient, moisturizer, thickening agent, and anti-static agent. The chemical formula is CH_{3}(CH_{2})_{14}COOCH(CH_{3})_{2}. It is frequently used in the food industry, and is not considered to be harmful to humans.
