= Butyl butyrate =

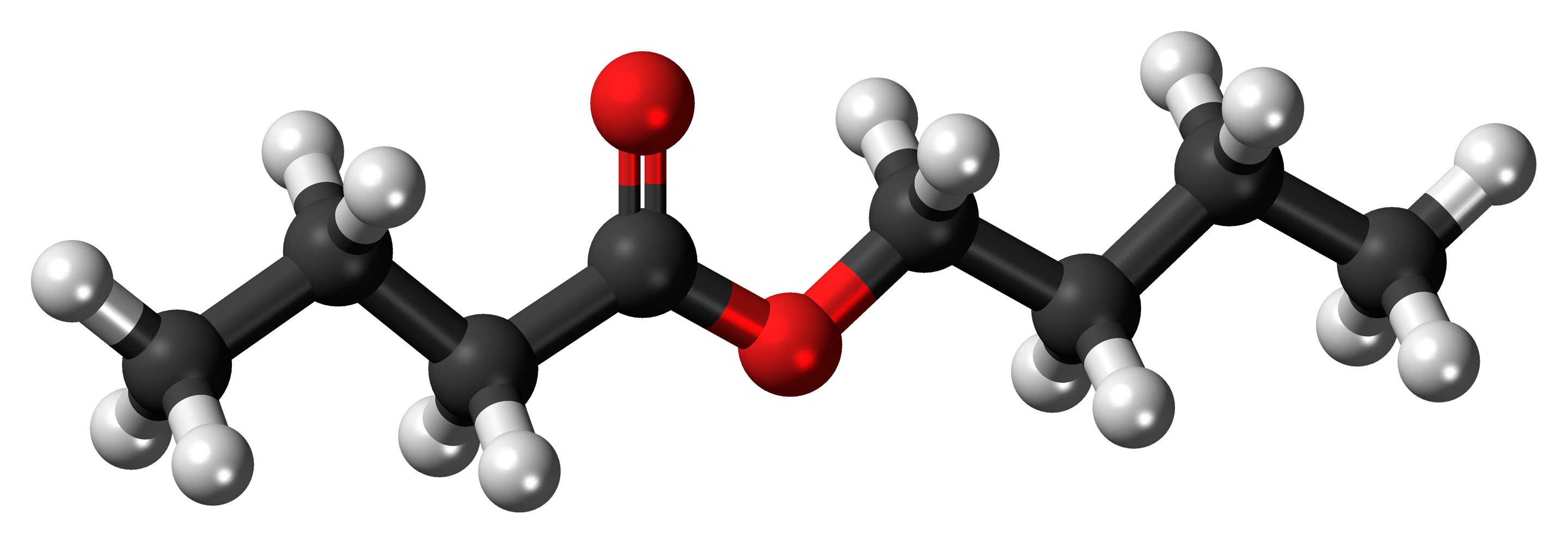

Names
- Preferred IUPAC name Butyl butanoate
- Other names Butyl butyrate 1-Butyl butyrate n-Butyl butyrate n-Butyl n-butyrate Butanoic acid butyl ester Butyric acid butyl ester n-Butyl butanoate

Identifiers
CAS Number	109-21-7
3D model (JSmol)	Interactive image
ChEBI	CHEBI:87429
ChemSpider	7694
ECHA InfoCard	100.003.325
EC Number	203-656-8
PubChem CID	7983
RTECS number	ES8120000
UNII	1BHV00T1M4
UN number	3082
CompTox Dashboard (EPA)	DTXSID7041702
- InChI: InChI=1S/C8H16O2/c1-3-5-7-10-8(9)6-4-2/h3-7H2,1-2H3 Key: XUPYJHCZDLZNFP-UHFFFAOYSA-N; InChI=1/C8H16O2/c1-3-5-7-10-8(9)6-4-2/h3-7H2,1-2H3 Key: XUPYJHCZDLZNFP-UHFFFAOYAI
- SMILES: CCCC(=O)OCCCC

Properties
Chemical formula	C_{8}H_{16}O_{2}
Molar mass	144.214 g·mol^{−1}
Density	0.8692 g/cm^{3} at 20 °C
Melting point	−91.5 °C (−132.7 °F; 181.7 K)
Boiling point	165 °C (329 °F; 438 K)
Solubility in water	insoluble

Hazards
- GHS labelling
Pictograms	(GHS02: Flammable)
Signal word	Warning
Hazard statements	H226
Precautionary statements	P210, P233, P240, P241, P242, P243, P280, P303+P361+P353, P370+P378, P403+P235, P501
NFPA 704 (fire diamond)	1 2 0
Flash point	49 °C (120 °F; 322 K)
- Except where otherwise noted, data are given for materials in their standard state (at 25 °C [77 °F], 100 kPa). verify (what is ?) Infobox references

Butyl butyrate, or butyl butanoate, is an organic compound that is an ester formed by the condensation of butyric acid and n-butanol. It is a clear, colorless liquid that is insoluble in water, but miscible with ethanol and diethyl ether. Its refractive index is 1.406 at 20 °C (68 °F).

== Aroma ==
Like other volatile esters, butyl butyrate has a pleasant aroma. It is used in the flavor industry to create sweet fruity flavors that are similar to that of pineapple (described as fruity, banana, pineapple, green, cherry, tropical fruit, ripe fruit). It occurs naturally in many kinds of fruit including apple, banana, berries, pear, plum, and strawberry.

== Safety ==
It is a marine pollutant. It mildly irritates the eyes and skin.
