= Ethyl salicylate =

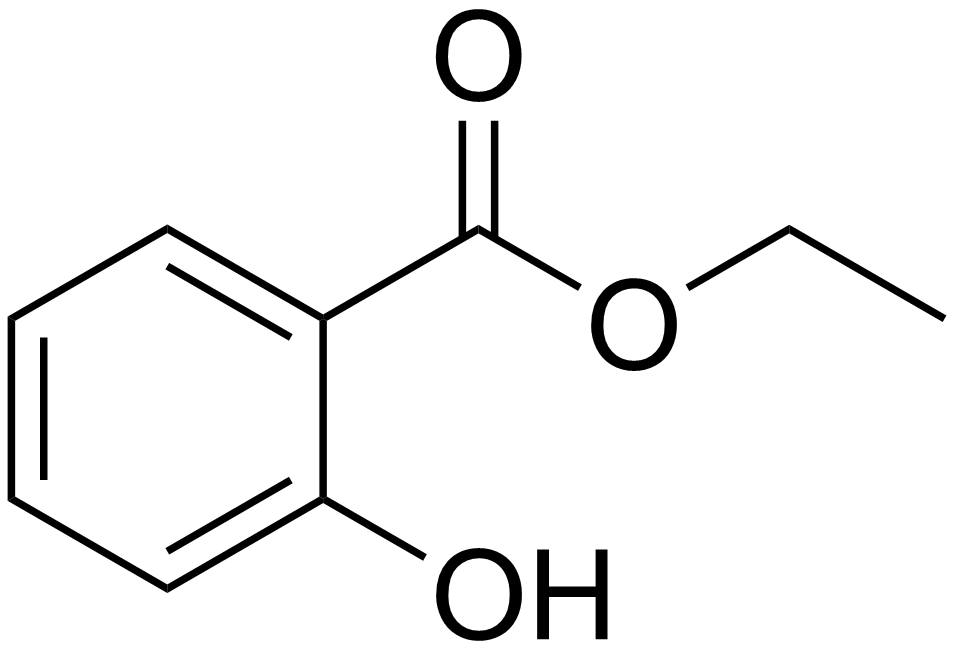

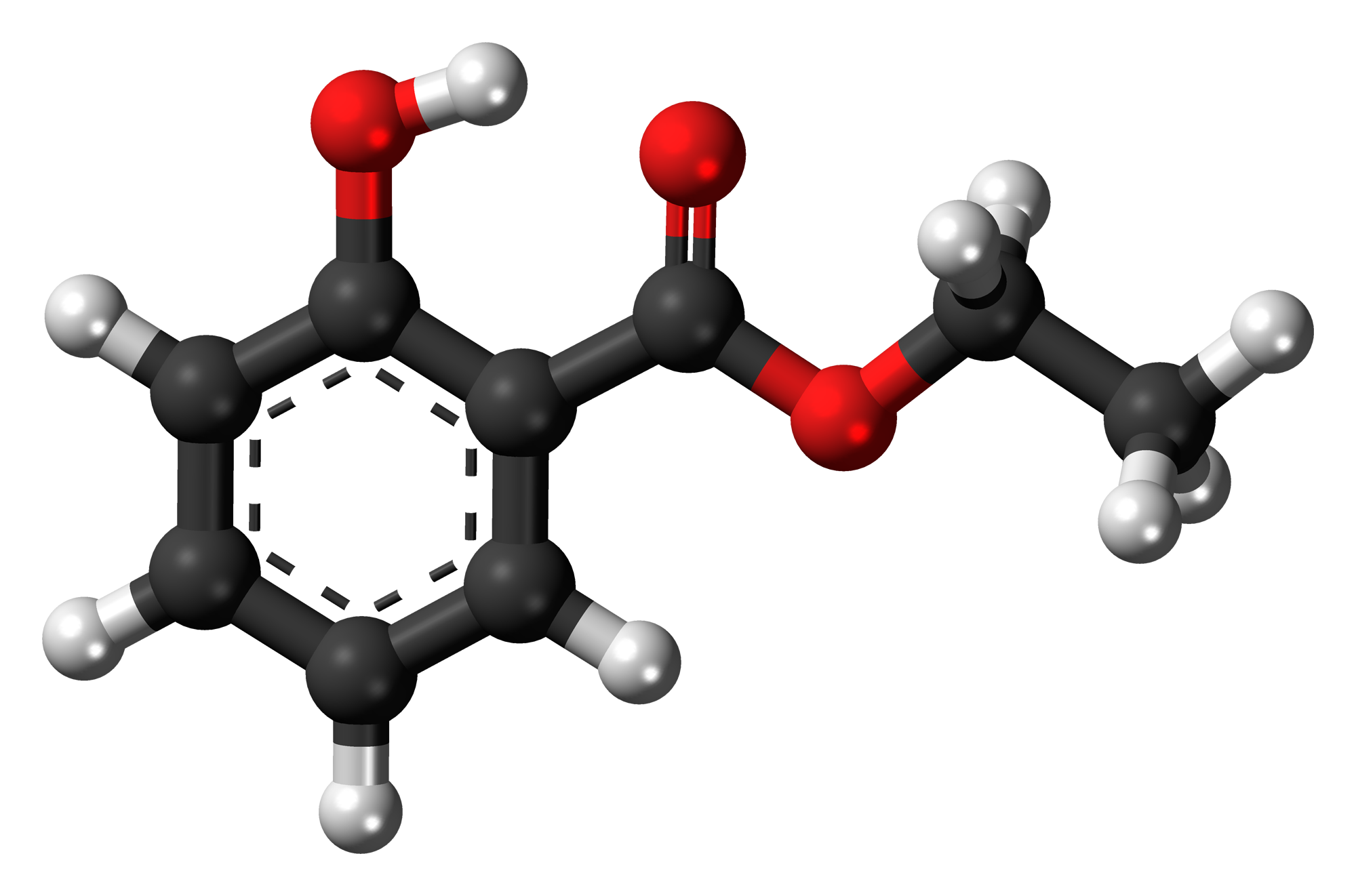

Names
- Preferred IUPAC name Ethyl 2-hydroxybenzoate

Identifiers
CAS Number	118-61-6
3D model (JSmol)	Interactive image
ChemSpider	21105897
ECHA InfoCard	100.003.878
PubChem CID	8365
UNII	555U6TZ2MV
CompTox Dashboard (EPA)	DTXSID1021958
- InChI: InChI=1S/C9H10O3/c1-2-12-9(11)7-5-3-4-6-8(7)10/h3-6,10H,2H2,1H3 Key: GYCKQBWUSACYIF-UHFFFAOYSA-N; InChI=1/C9H10O3/c1-2-12-9(11)7-5-3-4-6-8(7)10/h3-6,10H,2H2,1H3 Key: GYCKQBWUSACYIF-UHFFFAOYAH
- SMILES: O=C(OCC)c1ccccc1O

Properties
Chemical formula	C_{9}H_{10}O_{3}
Molar mass	166.176 g·mol^{−1}
Appearance	Colorless liquid
Odor	wintergreen
Density	1.13 g/cm^{3}
Melting point	1.3 °C (34.3 °F; 274.4 K)
Boiling point	232 °C (450 °F; 505 K)

Hazards
- GHS labelling
Pictograms	(GHS07: Exclamation mark)
Signal word	Warning
Hazard statements	H302
Precautionary statements	P264, P270, P301+P317, P330, P501
- Except where otherwise noted, data are given for materials in their standard state (at 25 °C [77 °F], 100 kPa). verify (what is ?) Infobox references

Ethyl salicylate is the ester formed by the condensation of salicylic acid and ethanol. It is a clear liquid that is sparingly soluble in water, but soluble in alcohol and ether. It has a pleasant odor resembling wintergreen and is used in perfumery and artificial flavors. More specifically, its aroma is described as "sweet, wintergreen, minty, floral, spicy, balsamic, tutti frutti, cooling".

== See also ==
- Methyl salicylate
- Isopropyl salicylate
