= Octyl acetate =

- Skeletal formula of octyl acetate

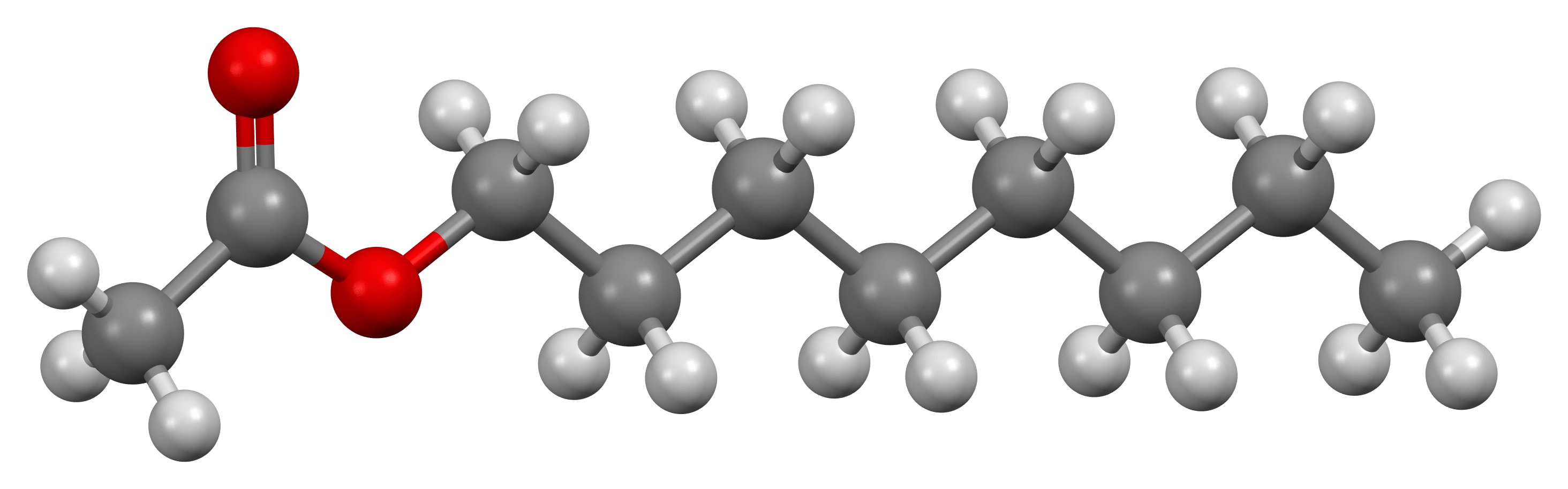
- Ball-and-stick model of the octyl acetate molecule

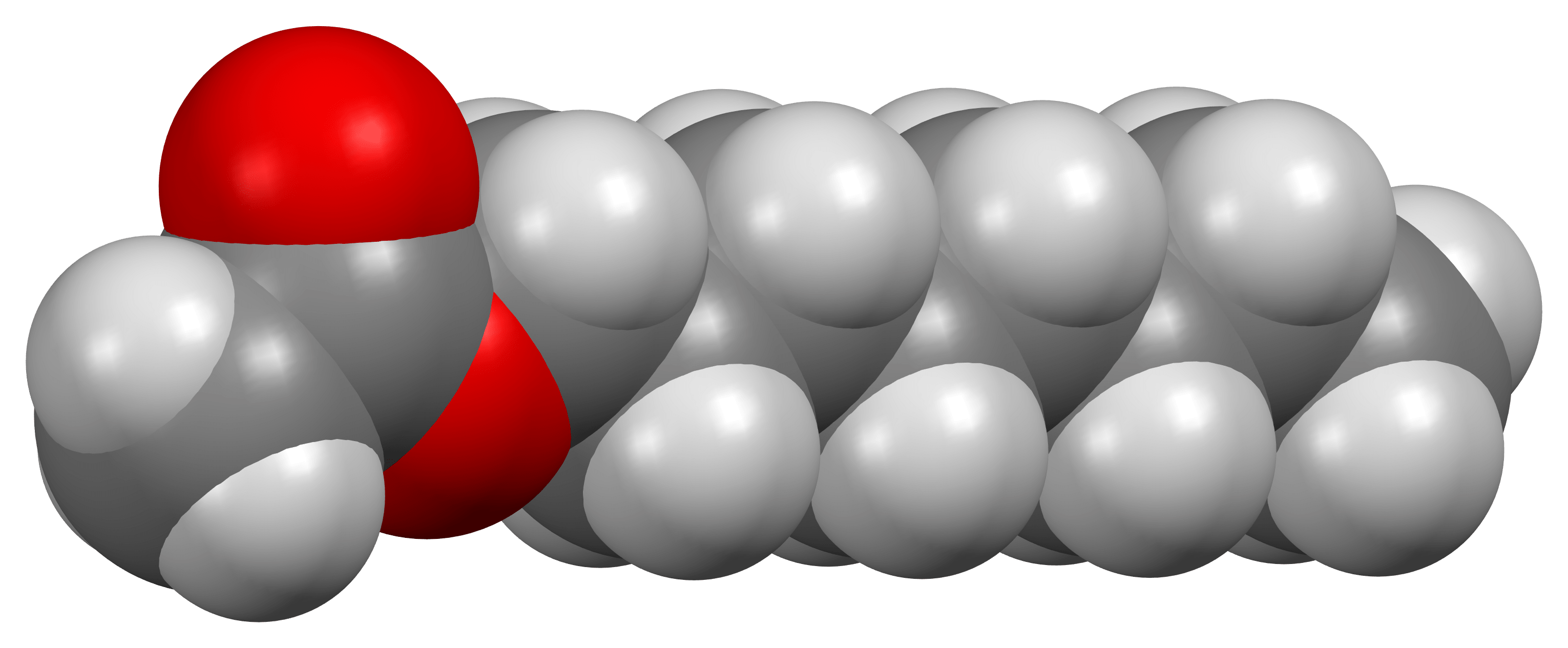
- Space-filling model of the octyl acetate molecule

Names
- Preferred IUPAC name Octyl acetate
- Other names n-Octyl acetate

Identifiers
CAS Number	112-14-1
3D model (JSmol)	Interactive image
ChEBI	CHEBI:87495
ChemSpider	7872
ECHA InfoCard	100.003.581
PubChem CID	8164
RTECS number	AJ1400000
UNII	X0FN2J413S
CompTox Dashboard (EPA)	DTXSID8044202
- InChI: InChI=1S/C10H20O2/c1-3-4-5-6-7-8-9-12-10(2)11/h3-9H2,1-2H3 Key: YLYBTZIQSIBWLI-UHFFFAOYSA-N; InChI=1/C10H20O2/c1-3-4-5-6-7-8-9-12-10(2)11/h3-9H2,1-2H3 Key: YLYBTZIQSIBWLI-UHFFFAOYAX
- SMILES: O=C(OCCCCCCCC)C

Properties
Chemical formula	C_{10}H_{20}O_{2}
Molar mass	172.268 g·mol^{−1}
Appearance	Colorless liquid
Odor	Fruity, slightly waxy floral odor
Density	0.863–0.87 g/cm^{3}
Melting point	−38.5 – −38 °C (−37.3 – −36.4 °F; 234.7–235.2 K)
Boiling point	203–211.3 °C (397.4–412.3 °F; 476.1–484.4 K); 112.55 °C (234.59 °F; 385.70 K) at 30 mmHg
Solubility in water	0.021 g/100 g (0 °C); 0.018 g/100 g (29.7 °C); 0.018 g/100 g (40 °C); 0.012 g/100 g (92.1 °C)
Solubility	Soluble in EtOH, ether
Vapor pressure	0.01 kPa (−3 °C); 0.0072–0.0073 (14.75 °C); 0.02–0.1 kPa (27 °C); 1 kPa (66.3 °C); 10 kPa (120 °C)
Refractive index (n_{D})	1.415–1.422 (20 °C)

Thermochemistry
Heat capacity (C)	331–343.74 J/mol·K

Hazards
NFPA 704 (fire diamond)	1 2 0
Flash point	83–86 °C (181–187 °F; 356–359 K)
Autoignition temperature	268–268.3 °C (514.4–514.9 °F; 541.1–541.5 K)
Explosive limits	0.76–8.14%
- Lethal dose or concentration (LD, LC)
LD_{50} (median dose)	3000 mg/kg (oral, rat); 5000 mg/kg (dermal, rabbit)
- Except where otherwise noted, data are given for materials in their standard state (at 25 °C [77 °F], 100 kPa). verify (what is ?) Infobox references

Octyl acetate, or octyl ethanoate, is an organic compound with the formula CH_{3}(CH_{2})_{7}O_{2}CCH_{3}. It is classified as an ester that is formed from 1-octanol (octyl alcohol) and acetic acid. It is found in oranges, grapefruits, and other citrus products.

Octyl acetate can be synthesized by the Fischer esterification of 1-octanol and acetic acid:

CH_{3}(CH_{2})_{7}OH + CH_{3}CO_{2}H → CH_{3}(CH_{2})_{7}O_{2}CCH_{3} + H_{2}O

== Uses ==
Because of its fruity odor, octyl acetate is used as the basis for artificial flavors and in perfumery where it lends green, earthy, mushroom, herbal, waxy, fruity, and apple notes. It is also a solvent for nitrocellulose, waxes, oils, and some resins.
