= Ethyl formate =

Ethyl formate
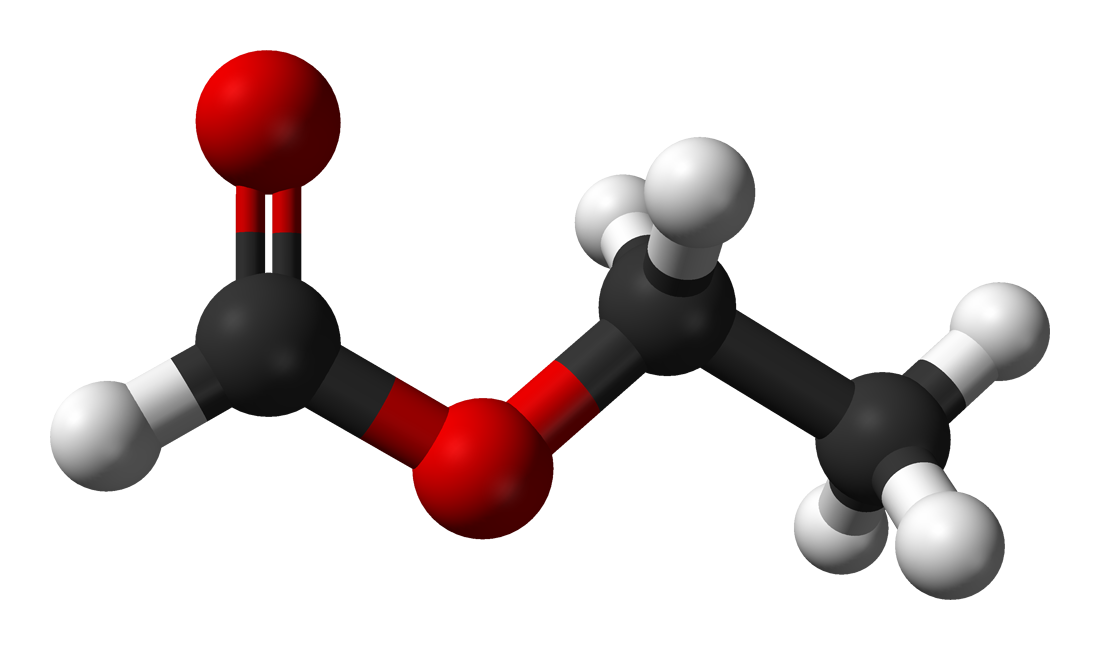

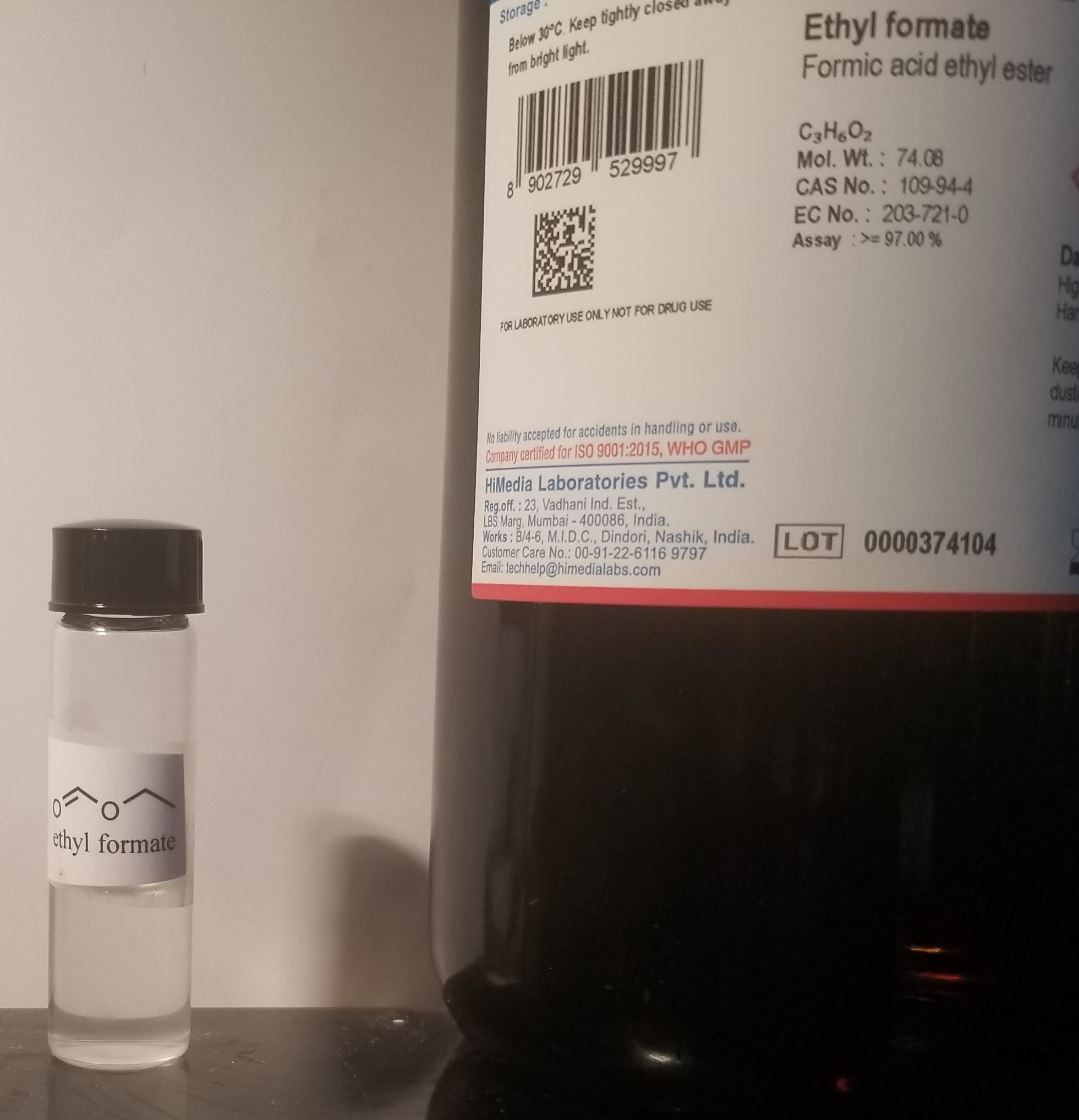

Names
- Preferred IUPAC name Ethyl formate
- Systematic IUPAC name Ethyl methanoate

Identifiers
CAS Number	109-94-4
3D model (JSmol)	Interactive image
Beilstein Reference	906769
ChEBI	CHEBI:52342
ChEMBL	ChEMBL44215
ChemSpider	7734
ECHA InfoCard	100.003.384
EC Number	203-721-0
PubChem CID	8025
RTECS number	LQ8400000
UNII	0K3E2L5553
UN number	1190
CompTox Dashboard (EPA)	DTXSID6040117
- InChI: InChI=1S/C3H6O2/c1-2-5-3-4/h3H,2H2,1H3 Key: WBJINCZRORDGAQ-UHFFFAOYSA-N; InChI=1/C3H6O2/c1-2-5-3-4/h3H,2H2,1H3 Key: WBJINCZRORDGAQ-UHFFFAOYAO
- SMILES: O=COCC

Properties
Chemical formula	HCOOCH_{2}CH_{3}
Molar mass	74.079 g·mol^{−1}
Appearance	Colorless liquid
Odor	fruity
Density	0.917 g/cm^{3}
Melting point	−80 °C; −112 °F; 193 K
Boiling point	54.0 °C (129.2 °F; 327.1 K)
Solubility in water	9% (17.78 °C)
Vapor pressure	200 mmHg (20°C)
Magnetic susceptibility (χ)	−43.00·10^{−6} cm^{3}/mol

Hazards
Flash point	−20 °C; −4 °F; 253 K
Explosive limits	2.8% - 16.0%
- Lethal dose or concentration (LD, LC)
LD_{50} (median dose)	1850 mg/kg (rat, oral); 1110 mg/kg (guinea pig, oral); 2075 mg/kg (rabbit, oral)
LC_{Lo} (lowest published)	10,000 ppm (cat, 1.5 hr); 8000 ppm (rat, 4 hr)
- NIOSH (US health exposure limits)
PEL (Permissible)	TWA 100 ppm (300 mg/m^{3})
REL (Recommended)	TWA 100 ppm (300 mg/m^{3})
IDLH (Immediate danger)	1500 ppm
- Except where otherwise noted, data are given for materials in their standard state (at 25 °C [77 °F], 100 kPa). verify (what is ?) Infobox references

Ethyl formate is an ester formed when ethanol (an alcohol) reacts with formic acid (a carboxylic acid). Ethyl formate has the characteristic smell of rum and is partially responsible for the flavour (ethereal, green) of raspberries, occurring naturally in some plant oils, fruits, and juices.

== Exposure ==
Ethyl formate is generally recognized as safe by the U.S. Food and Drug Administration.

According to the U.S Occupational Safety and Health Administration (OSHA), ethyl formate can irritate eyes, skin, mucous membranes, and the respiratory system of humans and other animals; it is also a central nervous system depressant. In industry, it is used as a solvent for cellulose nitrate, cellulose acetate, oils, and greases. It can be used as a substitute for acetone; workers may also be exposed to it under the following circumstances:

- during spray, brush, or dip applications of lacquers
- during the manufacture of safety glass
- when fumigating tobacco, cereals, and dried fruits (as an alternative to methyl bromide under the U.S. Department of Agriculture quarantine system)

OSHA considers a time-weighted average of 100 parts per million (300 milligrams per cubic meter) over an eight-hour period as the permissible exposure limit. The U.S. National Institute for Occupational Safety and Health (NIOSH) also considers a time-weighted average of 100 ppm over an eight-hour period as the recommended exposure limit.

== In space ==
Ethyl formate has been identified in dust clouds in an area of the Milky Way galaxy called Sagittarius B2. It is among 50 molecular species identified using the 30 metre IRAM radiotelescope.
