= Methyl pentanoate =

Names
- Preferred IUPAC name Methyl pentanoate
- Other names Methyl valerate

Identifiers
CAS Number	624-24-8
3D model (JSmol)	Interactive image
ChemSpider	11706
ECHA InfoCard	100.009.853
PubChem CID	12206
UNII	ZW21JJJ9VN
CompTox Dashboard (EPA)	DTXSID9060784
- InChI: InChI=1S/C6H12O2/c1-3-4-5-6(7)8-2/h3-5H2,1-2H3 Key: HNBDRPTVWVGKBR-UHFFFAOYSA-N; InChI=1/C6H12O2/c1-3-4-5-6(7)8-2/h3-5H2,1-2H3 Key: HNBDRPTVWVGKBR-UHFFFAOYAG
- SMILES: O=C(OC)CCCC

Properties
Chemical formula	C_{6}H_{12}O_{2}
Molar mass	116.160 g·mol^{−1}
Density	0.89 g/cm^{3}
Melting point	<25 °C
Boiling point	126 °C (259 °F; 399 K)
- Except where otherwise noted, data are given for materials in their standard state (at 25 °C [77 °F], 100 kPa). verify (what is ?) Infobox references

Methyl pentanoate, commonly known as methyl valerate, is the methyl ester of pentanoic acid (valeric acid) with a fruity odor (sweet, green, fruity, apple, pineapple, tutti frutti, juicy).

Methyl pentanoate is commonly used in fragrances, beauty care, soap, laundry detergents at levels of 0.1–1%.

In a very pure form (greater than 99.5%) it is used as a plasticizer in the manufacture of plastics.

It is also used as an insecticide.

== See also ==
- Ethyl pentanoate
