= Ethyl butyrate =

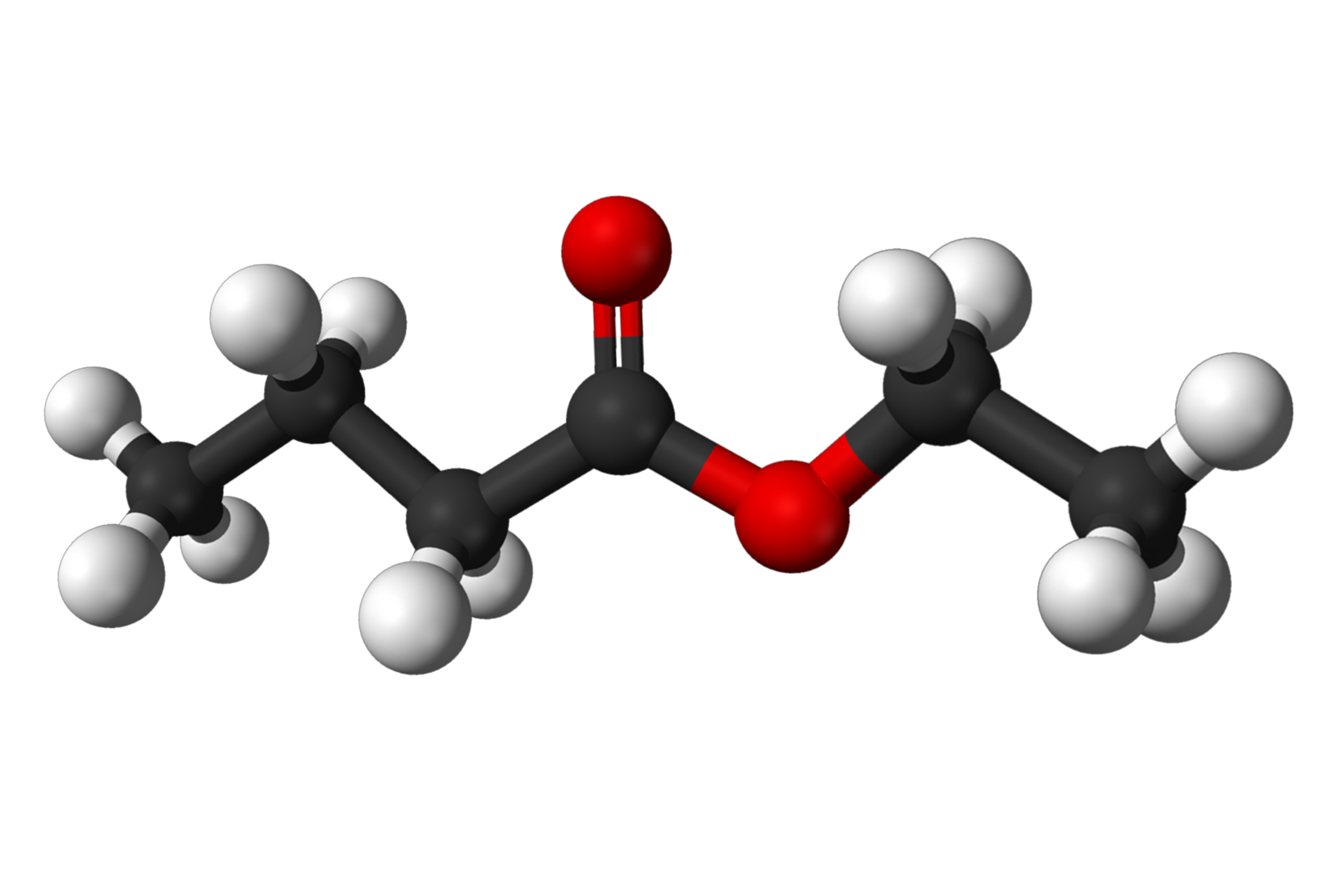

Names
- Preferred IUPAC name Ethyl butanoate
- Other names Butanoic acid ethyl ester Ethyl butyrate Butyric acid ethyl ester Ethyl n-butanoate Ethyl n-butyrate Butyric ether UN 1180

Identifiers
CAS Number	105-54-4
3D model (JSmol)	Interactive image
ChEBI	CHEBI:88764
ChEMBL	ChEMBL44800
ChemSpider	7475
ECHA InfoCard	100.003.007
EC Number	203-306-4
PubChem CID	7762
UNII	UFD2LZ005D
CompTox Dashboard (EPA)	DTXSID6040111
- InChI: InChI=1S/C6H12O2/c1-3-5-6(7)8-4-2/h3-5H2,1-2H3 Key: OBNCKNCVKJNDBV-UHFFFAOYSA-N; InChI=1/C6H12O2/c1-3-5-6(7)8-4-2/h3-5H2,1-2H3 Key: OBNCKNCVKJNDBV-UHFFFAOYAO
- SMILES: CCCC(=O)OCC

Properties
Chemical formula	C_{6}H_{12}O_{2}
Molar mass	116.160 g·mol^{−1}
Appearance	Colorless liquid with fruity odor (typically pineapple)
Density	0.879 g/cm^{3}
Melting point	−93 °C (−135 °F; 180 K)
Boiling point	120–121 °C (248–250 °F; 393–394 K)
Solubility in water	Soluble in 150 parts
Vapor pressure	1510 Pa (11.3 mmHg)
Magnetic susceptibility (χ)	−77.7×10^{−6} cm^{3}/mol

Hazards
- GHS labelling
Pictograms	(GHS02: Flammable)
Signal word	Warning
Hazard statements	H226
Precautionary statements	P210, P233, P240, P241, P242, P243, P280, P303+P361+P353, P370+P378, P403+P235, P501
NFPA 704 (fire diamond)	1 2 0
Flash point	26 °C; 78 °F; 299 K c.c.
Autoignition temperature	463 °C (865 °F; 736 K)
- Lethal dose or concentration (LD, LC)
LD_{50} (median dose)	1350 mg/kg (oral, rat)
- Except where otherwise noted, data are given for materials in their standard state (at 25 °C [77 °F], 100 kPa). verify (what is ?) Infobox references

Ethyl butyrate, also known as ethyl butanoate, or butyric ether, is an ester with the chemical formula CH_{3}CH_{2}CH_{2}COOCH_{2}CH_{3}. It is soluble in propylene glycol, paraffin oil, and kerosene. It has a fruity odour (fruity, juicy fruit, pineapple, cognac, sweet, tutti frutti), similar to pineapple, and is a key ingredient used as a flavor enhancer in processed orange juices. It also occurs naturally in many fruits, albeit at lower concentrations.

== Uses ==
It is commonly used as artificial flavoring resembling orange juice and is hence used in nearly all orange juices sold in the US, including those sold as "fresh" or “concentrated". It is also used in alcoholic beverages (e.g. martinis, daiquiris etc.), as a solvent in perfumery products, and as a plasticizer for cellulose.

Ethyl butyrate is one of the most common chemicals used in flavors and fragrances. It is used in a variety of flavourings, including orange (the most common), cherry, pineapple, mango, guava, bubblegum, peach, apricot, fig and plum. Ethyl butyrate is synthesised in Jamaican rum upon the esterification of butyric acid from muck and ethanol during the distillation process. This gives Jamaican rum its pleasant flavour. In industrial use, it is also one of the cheapest chemicals, which only adds to its popularity.

== Production ==
It can be synthesized by reacting ethanol and butyric acid. This is a condensation reaction, meaning water is produced in the reaction as a byproduct. Ethyl butyrate from natural sources can be distinguished from synthetic ethyl butyrate by stable isotope ratio analysis (SIRA).

== Table of physical properties ==
Property	Value
Critical temperature (T_{c})	296 °C (569 K)
Critical pressure (p_{c})	3.10 MPa (30.64 bar)
Critical density (ρ_{c})	2.38 mol.l^{−1}
Refractive index (n) at 20 °C	1.390 - 1.394

== See also ==
- Butyric acid
- Butyrates
- Methyl butyrate
