= Ethyl hexanoate =

Names
- Preferred IUPAC name Ethyl hexanoate
- Other names Ethyl caproate Caproic acid ethyl ester

Identifiers
CAS Number	123-66-0
3D model (JSmol)	Interactive image
ChemSpider	29005
ECHA InfoCard	100.004.220
PubChem CID	31265
UNII	FLO6YR1SHT
CompTox Dashboard (EPA)	DTXSID3021980
- InChI: InChI=1S/C8H16O2/c1-3-5-6-7-8(9)10-4-2/h3-7H2,1-2H3 Key: SHZIWNPUGXLXDT-UHFFFAOYSA-N; InChI=1/C8H16O2/c1-3-5-6-7-8(9)10-4-2/h3-7H2,1-2H3 Key: SHZIWNPUGXLXDT-UHFFFAOYAA
- SMILES: CCCCCC(=O)OCC

Properties
Chemical formula	C_{8}H_{16}O_{2}
Molar mass	144.214 g·mol^{−1}
Appearance	Colorless liquid
Odor	Fruity
Density	0.87 g/cm^{3}
Melting point	−67 °C (−89 °F; 206 K)
Boiling point	168 °C (334 °F; 441 K)

Hazards
- GHS labelling
Pictograms	(GHS02: Flammable)
Signal word	Warning
Hazard statements	H226
Precautionary statements	P210, P233, P240, P241, P242, P243, P280, P303+P361+P353, P370+P378, P403+P235, P501
- Except where otherwise noted, data are given for materials in their standard state (at 25 °C [77 °F], 100 kPa). (what is ?) Infobox references

Ethyl hexanoate is an organic compound with the formula C_{2}H_{5}O_{2}C(CH_{2})_{6}CH_{3}. A colorless oily liquid, is the ester resulting from the condensation of hexanoic acid and ethanol. It has fruity aroma similar to apple peel and pineapple (sweet, fruity, pineapple, waxy, green). It is a flavor component of baijiu.
