= Isobutyl formate =

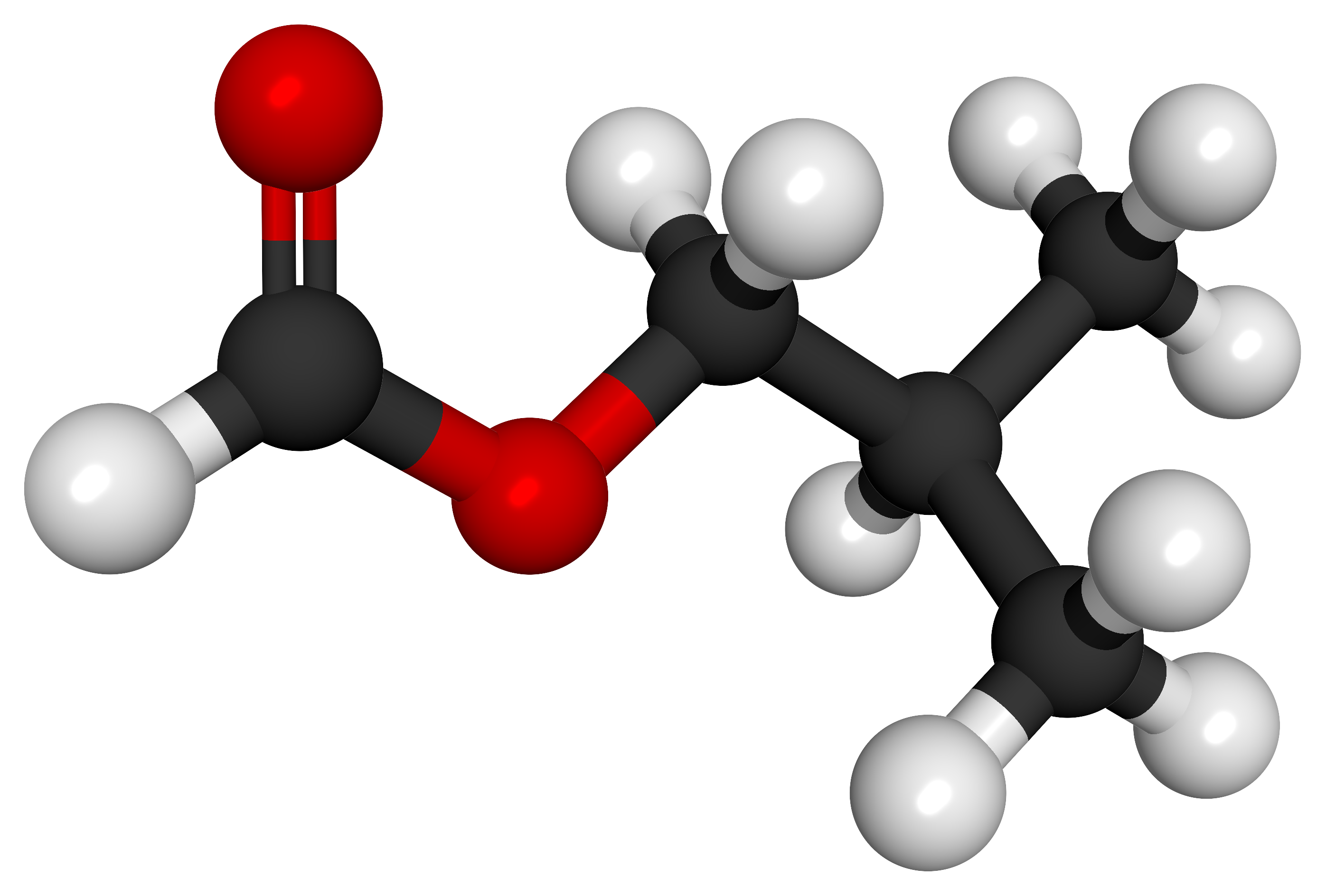
- Ball and stick model of isobutyl formate

Names
- Preferred IUPAC name 2-Methylpropyl formate
- Other names Isobutyl formate

Identifiers
CAS Number	542-55-2
3D model (JSmol)	Interactive image
ChEBI	CHEBI:173348
ChemSpider	10492
ECHA InfoCard	100.008.017
EC Number	208-818-1
PubChem CID	10957
UNII	6OCL1KXH0Q
CompTox Dashboard (EPA)	DTXSID7060257
- InChI: InChI=1S/C5H10O2/c1-5(2)3-7-4-6/h4-5H,3H2,1-2H3 Key: AVMSWPWPYJVYKY-UHFFFAOYSA-N
- SMILES: O=COCC(C)C

Properties
Chemical formula	C_{5}H_{10}O_{2}
Molar mass	102.133 g·mol^{−1}
Density	0.885 g/mL
Melting point	−96 °C (−141 °F; 177 K)
Boiling point	98.4 °C (209.1 °F; 371.5 K)

Hazards
- GHS labelling
Pictograms	(GHS02: Flammable) (GHS07: Exclamation mark)
Signal word	Danger
Hazard statements	H225, H319, H335
Precautionary statements	P210, P233, P240, P241, P242, P243, P261, P264, P271, P280, P303+P361+P353, P304+P340, P305+P351+P338, P312, P337+P313, P370+P378, P403+P233, P403+P235, P405, P501
Flash point	10 °C (50 °F; 283 K)
- Except where otherwise noted, data are given for materials in their standard state (at 25 °C [77 °F], 100 kPa). verify (what is ?) Infobox references

Isobutyl formate (2-methylpropyl methanoate) is an organic ester with the chemical formula C_{5}H_{10}O_{2}. It is formed by the Fischer esterification of isobutanol with formic acid, with the aid of an acid catalyst. It is used as a flavor and fragrance ingredient because of its odor which is sweet, ethereal, and slightly fruity.
