= Allyl hexanoate =

Names
- Preferred IUPAC name Prop-2-en-1-yl hexanoate
- Other names Prop-2-enyl hexanoate Allyl hexanoate Allyl caproate Allyl n-caproate 2-Propenyl n-hexanoate Hexanoic acid 2-propenyl ester

Identifiers
CAS Number	123-68-2
3D model (JSmol)	Interactive image; Interactive image
ChemSpider	29006
ECHA InfoCard	100.004.222
EC Number	204-642-4
PubChem CID	31266
UNII	3VH84A363D
CompTox Dashboard (EPA)	DTXSID1047653
- InChI: InChI=1S/C9H16O2/c1-3-5-6-7-9(10)11-8-4-2/h4H,2-3,5-8H2,1H3 Key: RCSBILYQLVXLJG-UHFFFAOYSA-N; InChI=1/C9H16O2/c1-3-5-6-7-9(10)11-8-4-2/h4H,2-3,5-8H2,1H3 Key: RCSBILYQLVXLJG-UHFFFAOYAX
- SMILES: CCCCCC(OCC=C)=O; O=C(OCC=C)CCCCC

Properties
Chemical formula	C_{9}H_{16}O_{2}
Molar mass	156.225 g·mol^{−1}
Appearance	Colorless to pale yellow clear liquid
Density	0.887 g/mL; 0.884-0.892 g/mL
Boiling point	190 to 191 °C (374 to 376 °F; 463 to 464 K); 75-76 °C (15 mmHg)
Solubility in water	Insoluble

Hazards
- GHS labelling
Pictograms	(GHS06: Toxic) (GHS07: Exclamation mark) (GHS09: Environmental hazard)
Signal word	Danger
Hazard statements	H301, H311, H315, H319, H331, H410, H411, H412
Precautionary statements	P261, P264, P270, P271, P273, P280, P301+P310, P302+P352, P304+P340, P305+P351+P338, P311, P312, P321, P322, P330, P332+P313, P337+P313, P361, P362, P363, P391, P403+P233, P405, P501
Flash point	66 °C (151 °F; 339 K)
- Except where otherwise noted, data are given for materials in their standard state (at 25 °C [77 °F], 100 kPa). verify (what is ?) Infobox references

Allyl hexanoate is an organic compound with the formula C_{5}H_{11}CO_{2}CH_{2}CH=CH_{2}. It is a colorless liquid, although commercial samples appear yellowish. It occurs naturally in pineapples.

== Uses ==
Allyl hexanoate is employed principally in the formulation of pineapple flavors but it can also be used for peach and apricot essences and for apple blossom, peach blossom, and wisteria perfume compositions. It is an ingredient of some lipstick perfumes and cigarette tobacco. It also adds a sweet juicy note to citrus flavors.
