= Butyl propionate =

Butyl ester of propionic acid

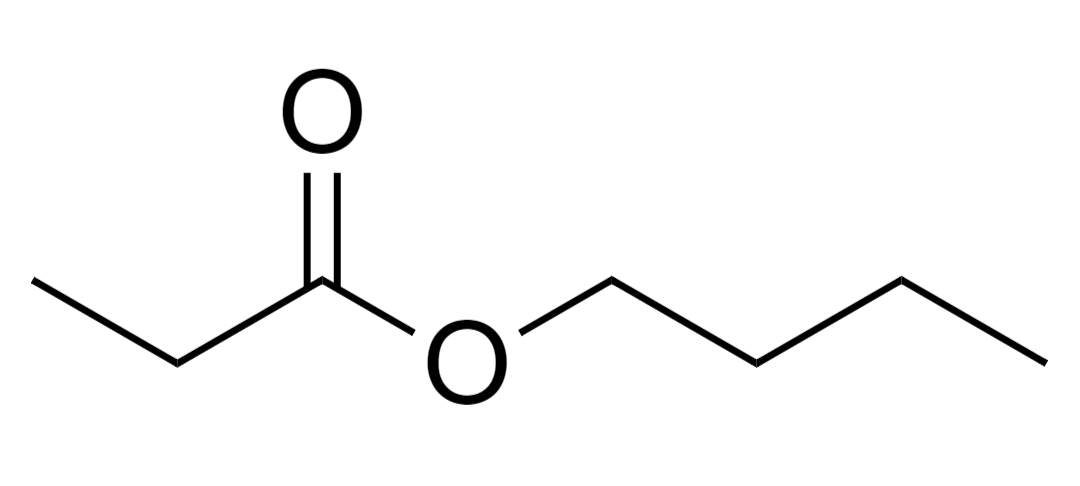

Names
- IUPAC name Butyl propionate
- Systematic IUPAC name Butyl propanoate
- Other names: n-Butyl propanoate; n-Butyl propionate; Propanoic acid, butyl ester; Propionic acid, butyl ester

Identifiers
CAS Number	590-01-2
3D model (JSmol)	Interactive image
ChEBI	CHEBI:89831
ChemSpider	11045
ECHA InfoCard	100.008.791
EC Number	209-669-5
PubChem CID	11529
RTECS number	UE8245000
UNII	2NXC4AK99E
UN number	1914
CompTox Dashboard (EPA)	DTXSID5027223
- InChI: InChI=1S/C7H14O2/c1-3-5-6-9-7(8)4-2/h3-6H2,1-2H3 Key: BTMVHUNTONAYDX-UHFFFAOYSA-N
- SMILES: CCCCOC(=O)CC

Properties
Chemical formula	CH_{3}CH_{2}COO(CH_{2})_{3}CH_{3}
Molar mass	130.187 g·mol^{−1}
Appearance	Colorless liquid
Odor	Pear drops, apple, strawberry, earthy, faintly sweet
Density	0.8754 g/cm^{3}
Melting point	−89 °C (−128 °F; 184 K)
Boiling point	146.8 °C (296.2 °F; 419.9 K)
Solubility in water	1.5 mg/mL at 20 °C (poor)
Solubility	Miscible with alcohol, ether
log P	2.314
Vapor pressure	0.589 kPa; 0.38 kPa at 20 °C
Refractive index (n_{D})	1.4014

Hazards
- Occupational safety and health (OHS/OSH)
Main hazards	Very flammable
- GHS labelling
Pictograms	(GHS02: Flammable)
Signal word	Warning
Hazard statements	H226
Precautionary statements	P210, P233, P240, P241, P242, P243, P280, P303+P361+P353, P370+P378, P403+P235, P501
Flash point	90 °F (32 °C)
Autoignition temperature	425 °C (797 °F)
- Lethal dose or concentration (LD, LC)
LD_{50} (median dose)	5000 mg/kg (oral, rat); >5000 mg/kg (skin, rabbit)
- Except where otherwise noted, data are given for materials in their standard state (at 25 °C [77 °F], 100 kPa). Infobox references

Butyl propionate is a butyl ester of propionic acid. This ester has the chemical formula CH_{3}CH_{2}COO(CH_{2})_{3}CH_{3}.

== Occurrence in nature ==
Butyl propionate is a plant metabolite, a human metabolite and an insect attractant. Butyl propionate is a natural ester found in Armenian apricot.

== Preparation ==
Butyl propionate is derived by esterification of propionic acid with butanol.

CH_{3}CH_{2}COOH + CH_{3}(CH_{2})_{3}OH ⇌ CH_{3}CH_{2}COO(CH_{2})_{3}CH_{3} + H_{2}O

== Properties ==
Butyl propionate is a colorless liquid with a pear drops-like or apple-like odor. The liquid is less dense than water. Its vapor is 4.5 times denser than the air at the mean ocean level.

== Uses ==
Butyl propionate is used to make fragrances, perfumes and as a flavoring. It is also used in paints and primers for auto body or engine, appliance coatings (paints designed specifically for painting household items and vehicles like microwave ovens, refrigerators and automobiles), enamels, lacquers, and printing inks, as a solvent for adhesives and nitrocellulose, and in polymerization reactions for acrylic resins.

== Hazards and toxicity ==
Butyl propionate may irritate skin and eyes. Exposure to its vapor may cause eye and respiratory system irritation. Upon ingestion, causes abdominal pain and nausea. This chemical is very flammable. It may ignite even at ambient temperatures. Above 32 °C (90 °F), explosive mixtures with air may be formed. Strong oxidizing acids may cause a violent reaction that is sufficiently exothermic to ignite this chemical and the reaction products. Upon catching a fire, irritating, toxic and suffocating gases may be produced, such as carbon dioxide and carbon monoxide.
