= Propyl propanoate =

Names
- Preferred IUPAC name Propyl propanoate
- Other names Propyl propionate

Identifiers
CAS Number	106-36-5
3D model (JSmol)	Interactive image
ChEBI	CHEBI:89828
ChemSpider	7515
ECHA InfoCard	100.003.082
EC Number	203-389-7
PubChem CID	7803
UNII	G09TRV00GK
CompTox Dashboard (EPA)	DTXSID4042337
- InChI: InChI=1S/C6H12O2/c1-3-5-8-6(7)4-2/h3-5H2,1-2H3 Key: MCSINKKTEDDPNK-UHFFFAOYSA-N; InChI=1/C6H12O2/c1-3-5-8-6(7)4-2/h3-5H2,1-2H3 Key: MCSINKKTEDDPNK-UHFFFAOYAX
- SMILES: CCCOC(=O)CC

Properties
Chemical formula	C_{6}H_{12}O_{2}
Molar mass	116.160 g·mol^{−1}
Density	0.833 g/cm^{3} at 20 °C
Melting point	−76 °C (−105 °F; 197 K)
Boiling point	122–124 °C (252–255 °F; 395–397 K)
Solubility in water	1 part per 200

Hazards
- GHS labelling
Pictograms	(GHS02: Flammable) (GHS07: Exclamation mark)
Signal word	Warning
Hazard statements	H226, H332
Precautionary statements	P210, P233, P240, P241, P242, P243, P261, P271, P280, P303+P361+P353, P304+P340, P317, P370+P378, P403+P235, P501
Safety data sheet (SDS)	Eastman MSDS
- Except where otherwise noted, data are given for materials in their standard state (at 25 °C [77 °F], 100 kPa). verify (what is ?) Infobox references

Propyl propanoate (also known as propyl propionate and n-propyl propionate) is the organic compound with the molecular formula C_{6}H_{12}O_{2}. It is the ester of propanol and propionic acid. Like most esters, propyl propanoate is a colorless liquid with a fruity odor. The scent of propyl propanoate is described as sharp, chemical, pungent, sweet, fruity, pineapple, winey. It is used in perfumery and as a solvent. The refractive index at 20 °C is 1.393.

Because propyl propanoate is a low-odor, moderately volatile ester solvent that is not a hazardous air pollutant (HAP), with good solvent activity and versatility, it is considered a safer substitute for toluene.
