= Sec-Amyl acetate =

sec-Amyl acetate

Names
- Preferred IUPAC name Pentan-2-yl acetate
- Other names 1-Methylbutyl acetate 2-Pentanol acetate 2-Pentyl ester of acetic acid

Identifiers
CAS Number	626-38-0
3D model (JSmol)	Interactive image
ChemSpider	11775
ECHA InfoCard	100.009.952
PubChem CID	12278
UNII	B570113U4Q
CompTox Dashboard (EPA)	DTXSID8052306
- InChI: InChI=1S/C7H14O2/c1-4-5-6(2)9-7(3)8/h6H,4-5H2,1-3H3 Key: GQKZRWSUJHVIPE-UHFFFAOYSA-N; InChI=1/C7H14O2/c1-4-5-6(2)9-7(3)8/h6H,4-5H2,1-3H3 Key: GQKZRWSUJHVIPE-UHFFFAOYAN
- SMILES: CCCC(C)OC(C)=O

Properties
Chemical formula	C_{7}H_{14}O_{2}
Molar mass	130.187 g·mol^{−1}
Appearance	Colorless liquid
Odor	Mild, like bananas
Density	0.87 g/mL (20°C)
Melting point	−78 °C; −109 °F; 195 K
Boiling point	121 °C; 249 °F; 394 K
Solubility in water	0.2g/100g water (20°C)
Vapor pressure	7 mmHg (20°C)

Hazards
- GHS labelling
Signal word	Warning
Hazard statements	H226
Flash point	32 °C; 89 °F; 305 K
Autoignition temperature	380 °C (716 °F; 653 K)
Explosive limits	1–7.5% (20°C)
- Lethal dose or concentration (LD, LC)
LC_{Lo} (lowest published)	9200 ppm (guinea pig, 7 hr); 10,000 ppm (guinea pig, 5 hr)
- NIOSH (US health exposure limits)
PEL (Permissible)	TWA 125 ppm (650 mg/m^{3})
REL (Recommended)	TWA 125 ppm (650 mg/m^{3})
IDLH (Immediate danger)	1000 ppm
- Except where otherwise noted, data are given for materials in their standard state (at 25 °C [77 °F], 100 kPa). Infobox references

sec-Amyl acetate is an organic compound and an ester. It is formed in an esterification reaction of sec-amyl alcohol (2-pentanol) and acetic acid. It is a colorless liquid. Its aroma is unusual for a simple ester and is described as herbal, weedy, musty, green, vegetable.
