= Pentyl pentanoate =

- Pentyl pentanoate

Names
- IUPAC name Pentyl pentanoate

Identifiers
CAS Number	2173-56-0
3D model (JSmol)	Interactive image
ChemSpider	56216
ECHA InfoCard	100.016.844
EC Number	218-528-7
PubChem CID	62433
UNII	694D4BU139
CompTox Dashboard (EPA)	DTXSID8042218
- InChI: InChI=1S/C10H20O2/c1-3-5-7-9-12-10(11)8-6-4-2/h3-9H2,1-2H3 Key: FGPPDYNPZTUNIU-UHFFFAOYSA-N; InChI=1/C10H20O2/c1-3-5-7-9-12-10(11)8-6-4-2/h3-9H2,1-2H3 Key: FGPPDYNPZTUNIU-UHFFFAOYAI
- SMILES: CCCCC(=O)OCCCCC

Properties
Chemical formula	C_{10}H_{20}O_{2}
Molar mass	172.268 g·mol^{−1}
Density	0.874 g/cm^{3}
Boiling point	207 °C (405 °F; 480 K)
- Except where otherwise noted, data are given for materials in their standard state (at 25 °C [77 °F], 100 kPa). verify (what is ?) Infobox references

Pentyl pentanoate (C_{4}H_{9}COOC_{5}H_{11}) is an ester used in dilute solution to replicate the scent or flavour of apple, and sometimes pineapple. It is referred to as pentyl valerate or amyl pentanoate using classical nomenclature. it can be used for a variety of chemical uses, such as in the production of flavoured products, like sweets.
