= Propyl hexanoate =

Names
- Preferred IUPAC name Propyl hexanoate
- Other names Propyl caproate

Identifiers
| CAS Number | 626-77-7 |
| 3D model (JSmol) | Interactive image |
| ChemSpider | 11790 |
| ECHA InfoCard | 100.009.967 |
| EC Number | 210-963-0 |
| PubChem CID | 12293 |
| UNII | 30A840S94U |
| CompTox Dashboard (EPA) | DTXSID3060823 |
- InChI: InChI=1S/C9H18O2/c1-3-5-6-7-9(10)11-8-4-2/h3-8H2,1-2H3 Key: HTUIWRWYYVBCFT-UHFFFAOYSA-N; InChI=1/C9H18O2/c1-3-5-6-7-9(10)11-8-4-2/h3-8H2,1-2H3 Key: HTUIWRWYYVBCFT-UHFFFAOYAY
- SMILES: CCCCCC(=O)OCCC

Properties
| Chemical formula | C_{9}H_{18}O_{2} |
| Molar mass | 158.241 g·mol^{−1} |
| Appearance | Clear, colorless liquid |
| Melting point | −68 °C (−90 °F; 205 K) |
| Boiling point | 186 °C (367 °F; 459 K) |
- Except where otherwise noted, data are given for materials in their standard state (at 25 °C [77 °F], 100 kPa). Infobox references

Propyl hexanoate (C_{9}H_{18}O_{2}), also known as propyl caproate, is an ester formed by the reaction of propanol with hexanoic acid. Although it is a completely different ester, propyl hexanoate shares the same chemical formula with methyl octanoate, ethyl heptanoate, butyl pentanoate, etc. because they all have the same total carbon chain length. The scent of this ester can be described as that of blackberries, pineapple, cheese or wine.

== Properties ==
Due to the length of the carbon chain in this molecule, there are only minor van der Waals forces acting upon it, which is why propyl hexanoate appears as a liquid and not a solid. Dipole-dipole forces are present because of the polar covalent bonds between carbon and oxygen, while hydrogen bonding only occurs with other molecules that can hydrogen bond.

== Preparation ==
Propyl hexanoate is formed by the condensation reaction (esterification) of propanol and hexanoic acid. The hydroxyl group from the propanol reacts with the hydroxyl group from the hexanoic acid to produce water and leave an oxygen that the parent acid and alcohol chains bond to, creating the ester. For this reaction to occur, it requires an acid catalyst, such as concentrated sulfuric acid, and heat.

The esterification process can also be reversed (hydrolysis) to get propanol and hexanoic acid back from propyl hexanoate. This reaction occurs between the ester and water in the presence of a dilute acid catalyst and heat.

== Uses ==
Propyl hexanoate, being an ester, is generally used for replicating the scents or flavors of fruit such as blackberry and pineapple, then is added to things such as food or perfume. It also has the use as a solvent for polar organic compounds.
