= Ethyl isovalerate =

Names
- Preferred IUPAC name Ethyl 3-methylbutanoate
- Other names Butanoic acid, 3-methyl-, ethyl ester

Identifiers
CAS Number	108-64-5
3D model (JSmol)	Interactive image
ChemSpider	7657
ECHA InfoCard	100.003.276
PubChem CID	7945
UNII	9ZZ5597636
CompTox Dashboard (EPA)	DTXSID3047057
- InChI: InChI=1S/C7H14O2/c1-4-9-7(8)5-6(2)3/h6H,4-5H2,1-3H3 Key: PPXUHEORWJQRHJ-UHFFFAOYSA-N; InChI=1/C7H14O2/c1-4-9-7(8)5-6(2)3/h6H,4-5H2,1-3H3 Key: PPXUHEORWJQRHJ-UHFFFAOYAE
- SMILES: CC(C)CC(=O)OCC

Properties
Chemical formula	C_{7}H_{14}O_{2}
Molar mass	130.187 g·mol^{−1}
Odor	Fruity
Density	0,8565 g/cm^{3}
Melting point	−99.3 °C (−146.7 °F; 173.8 K)
Boiling point	134.7 °C (274.5 °F; 407.8 K)
Magnetic susceptibility (χ)	−91.1·10^{−6} cm^{3}/mol
- Except where otherwise noted, data are given for materials in their standard state (at 25 °C [77 °F], 100 kPa). (what is ?) Infobox references

Ethyl isovalerate is an organic compound that is the ester formed from ethyl alcohol and isovaleric acid. It has a fruity odour and flavour and is used in perfumery and as a food additive.
