= Methyl laurate =

Ester

Names
- IUPAC name Methyl dodecanoate
- Other names: Lauric acid methyl ester; Methyl laurate; Dodecanoic acid methyl ester

Identifiers
CAS Number	111-82-0
3D model (JSmol)	Interactive image
ChEBI	CHEBI:87494
ChEMBL	ChEMBL1894365
ChemSpider	7847
ECHA InfoCard	100.003.556
EC Number	203-911-3
PubChem CID	8139
UNII	8IPS6BI6KW
CompTox Dashboard (EPA)	DTXSID5026889
- InChI: InChI=1S/C13H26O2/c1-3-4-5-6-7-8-9-10-11-12-13(14)15-2/h3-12H2,1-2H3 Key: UQDUPQYQJKYHQI-UHFFFAOYSA-N
- SMILES: CCCCCCCCCCCC(=O)OC

Properties
Chemical formula	C_{13}H_{26}O_{2}
Molar mass	214.349 g·mol^{−1}
Appearance	Colorless liquid
Odor	Fatty, floral, winey
Density	0.87 g/mL
Melting point	5.2 °C (41.4 °F; 278.3 K)
Boiling point	267 °C (513 °F; 540 K)
Solubility in water	Insoluble
Solubility	Miscible with ethanol, diethyl ether, acetone, soluble in most organic solvents and dipropylene glycol
Vapor pressure	0.0055 hPa
Refractive index (n_{D})	1.432

Hazards
- Occupational safety and health (OHS/OSH)
Main hazards	Very toxic to the aquatic life with long-lasting effects
- GHS labelling
Pictograms	(GHS09: Environmental hazard)
Signal word	Warning
Hazard statements	H400, H411
Precautionary statements	P273, P391, P501
Flash point	139 °C (282 °F)

Related compounds
Related compounds	Methyl acetate; Methyl butyrate; Methyl hexanoate; Methyl octanoate; Methyl decanoate
- Except where otherwise noted, data are given for materials in their standard state (at 25 °C [77 °F], 100 kPa). Infobox references

Methyl laurate is an organic compound with the chemical formula CH_{3}(CH_{2})_{10}COOCH_{3}. It is a colorless liquid. It has a fatty flavor. It is the methyl ester of lauric acid (dodecanoic acid). Methyl laurate belongs to the family of fatty acid esters. These are carboxylic esters of a fatty acid.

== Synthesis ==
Methyl laurate is synthesized by reaction between lauric acid and methanol by an esterification reaction, using Brønsted acid ionic liquids as catalysts (e.g., sulfuric acid).

CH_{3}(CH_{2})_{10}COOH + CH_{3}OH → CH_{3}(CH_{2})_{10}COOCH_{3} + H_{2}O

Lauric acid, as a component of triglycerides, comprises about a half of the fatty acid content in laurel oil, coconut oil, and palm kernel oil.

== Occurrence ==
Methyl laurate is found in species such as iyokan, mustard and Mandragora autumnalis. It is also found in alcoholic beverages, concord grape (Vitis labrusca), melon, pineapple, heated blackberry, red chilli (Capsicum frutescens) and other fruits. It is also present in cheese, hops oil, white wine, liquors and other foodstuffs.

== Uses ==
In food industry, methyl laurate is used as a flavoring agent. It is used as an intermediate for detergents, emulsifiers, wetting agents, stabilizers, lubricants, plasticizers, textiles, alkanolamides, fatty alcohols, and fatty acids. It is also used as an emollient and skin conditioning agent in lotions, skin creams, shampoos and hair oils. Methyl laurate is biodegradable. It is also used as a lubricant for machines and in metallurgy. Methyl laurate is used as a component of biodiesel, because it takes high attention due to its favorable combustion properties, including its high cetane number and low viscosity.
