= Pear drop =

British confection

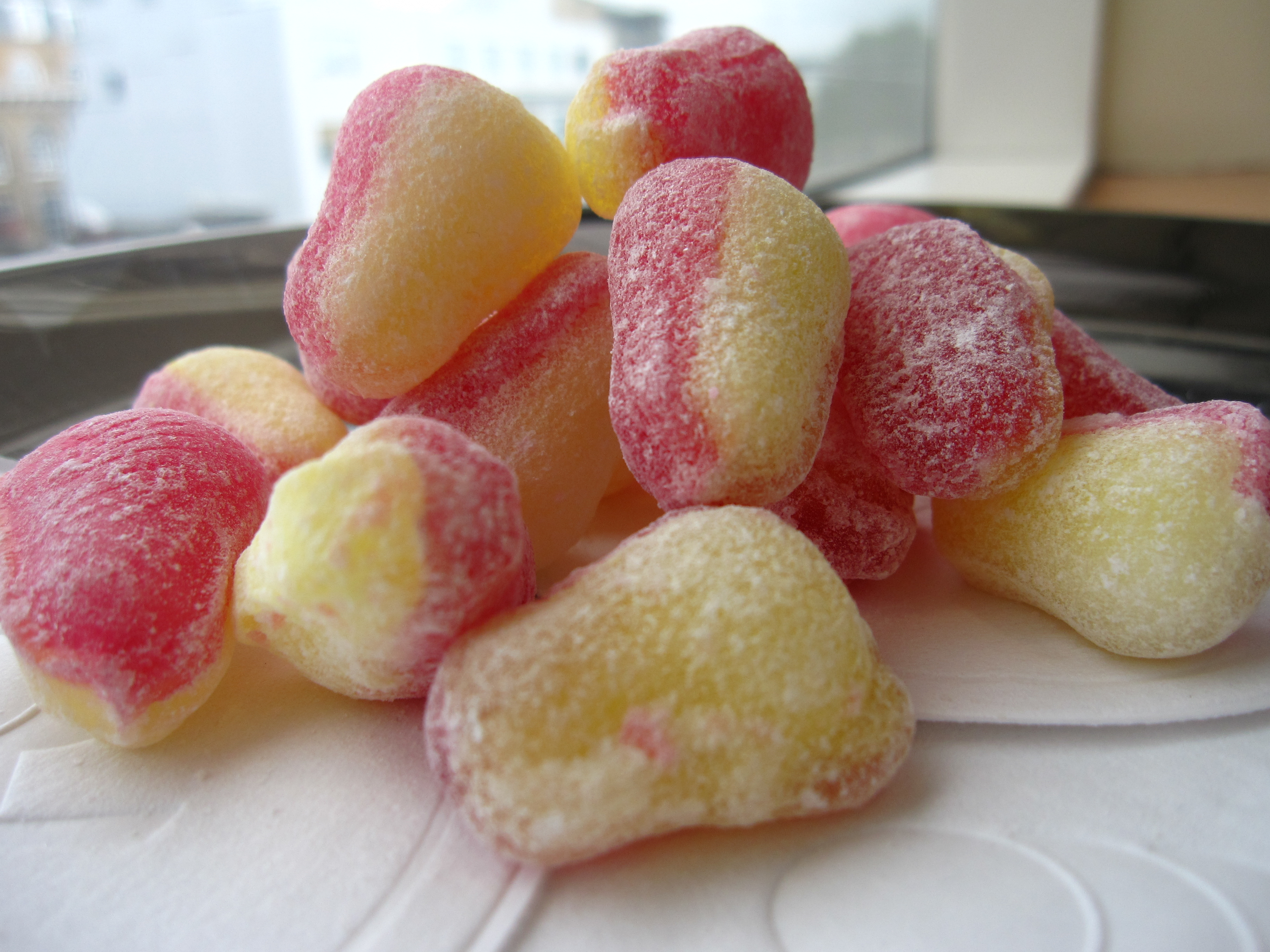
Pear drops

A pear drop is a British boiled sweet made from sugar and flavourings. "Old-fashioned" pear drops are a combination of half pink and half yellow in a pear-shaped drop about the size of a thumbnail, although they are more commonly found in packets containing separate yellow drops and pink drops in roughly equal proportions ("original"). The artificial flavours isoamyl acetate and ethyl acetate are responsible for the characteristic flavour of pear drops: the former confers a banana flavour, the latter a pear flavour. Both esters are used in many pear- and banana-flavoured sweets. However, a natural pear-derived product from pear juice concentrate is sometimes used.

The largest pear drop in the world is housed at Stockley's Sweets in Oswaldtwistle Mills in Oswaldtwistle, Lancashire, England. In 2009 a survey of 4,000 adults found that pear drops were the fourteenth most popular sweet in the United Kingdom.
