= Propanol =

There are two isomers of propanol.

- 1-Propanol, n-propanol, or propan-1-ol: CH_{3}CH_{2}CH_{2}OH, the most common meaning
- 2-Propanol, isopropyl alcohol, isopropanol, or propan-2-ol: (CH_{3})_{2}CHOH

== See also ==
- Propanal (propionaldehyde) differs in spelling from propanol by a single letter and is a different compound.
- Propranolol is a drug used for reducing blood pressure and hand tremors.
