= Methyl propionate =

Names
- Preferred IUPAC name Methyl propanoate
- Other names Methyl propionate Propanoic acid, methyl ester Propionic acid, methyl ester

Identifiers
CAS Number	554-12-1
3D model (JSmol)	Interactive image
ChemSpider	10653
ECHA InfoCard	100.008.238
PubChem CID	11124
UNII	NB21C0D33W
CompTox Dashboard (EPA)	DTXSID101036506, DTXSID201064449 DTXSID7027201, DTXSID101036506, DTXSID201064449
- InChI: InChI=1S/C4H8O2/c1-3-4(5)6-2/h3H2,1-2H3 Key: RJUFJBKOKNCXHH-UHFFFAOYSA-N; InChI=1/C4H8O2/c1-3-4(5)6-2/h3H2,1-2H3 Key: RJUFJBKOKNCXHH-UHFFFAOYAS
- SMILES: O=C(OC)CC

Properties
Chemical formula	C_{4}H_{8}O_{2}
Molar mass	88.106 g·mol^{−1}
Appearance	Colorless liquid
Density	0.915 g/mL
Melting point	−88 °C (−126 °F; 185 K)
Boiling point	80 °C (176 °F; 353 K)
Solubility in water	72 g/L (20 °C)
Magnetic susceptibility (χ)	−55.0·10^{−6} cm^{3}/mol

Hazards
- GHS labelling
Pictograms	(GHS02: Flammable) (GHS07: Exclamation mark)
Signal word	Danger
Hazard statements	H225, H332
Precautionary statements	P210, P233, P240, P241, P242, P243, P261, P271, P280, P303+P361+P353, P304+P340, P317, P370+P378, P403+P235, P501
Flash point	−2 °C (28 °F; 271 K)
Autoignition temperature	465 °C (869 °F; 738 K)
- Except where otherwise noted, data are given for materials in their standard state (at 25 °C [77 °F], 100 kPa). Infobox references

Methyl propionate, also known as methyl propanoate, is an organic compound with the molecular formula CH_{3}CH_{2}CO_{2}CH_{3}. It is a colorless liquid with a fruity, rum-like odor.

== Preparation ==
Methyl propionate can be prepared by esterification of propionic acid with methanol. Industrially, it is prepared by carboalkoxylation, i.e., the reaction of ethylene with carbon monoxide and methanol in the presence of a catalyst:

C_{2}H_{4} + CO + MeOH → MeO_{2}CCH_{2}CH_{3}

The reaction is catalyzed by nickel carbonyl and palladium(0) complexes.

== Uses ==
Condensation of Methyl propionate with formaldehyde followed by dehydration yields methyl methacrylate:

MeO_{2}CCH_{2}CH_{3} + CH_{2}O → MeO_{2}CCH(CH_{2}OH)CH_{3}
MeO_{2}CCH(CH_{2}OH)CH_{3} → MeO_{2}CC(=CH_{2})CH_{3}

Methyl propionate is used as a solvent for cellulose nitrate and lacquers, and as a raw material for the production of paints, varnishes and other chemicals such as methyl methacrylate.

Due to its fruity smell and taste, it is also used in fragrances and flavoring.
