= Ethyl heptanoate =

- Ethyl heptanoate

Names
- Preferred IUPAC name Ethyl heptanoate
- Other names Heptanoic acid ethyl ester Ethyl enanthate Ethyl heptylate Enanthic acid ethyl ester

Identifiers
CAS Number	106-30-9
3D model (JSmol)	Interactive image
ChEBI	CHEBI:86618
ChemSpider	7509
ECHA InfoCard	100.003.076
PubChem CID	7797
UNII	45R404Y5X8
CompTox Dashboard (EPA)	DTXSID1040112
- InChI: InChI=1S/C9H18O2/c1-3-5-6-7-8-9(10)11-4-2/h3-8H2,1-2H3 Key: TVQGDYNRXLTQAP-UHFFFAOYSA-N; InChI=1/C9H18O2/c1-3-5-6-7-8-9(10)11-4-2/h3-8H2,1-2H3 Key: TVQGDYNRXLTQAP-UHFFFAOYAW
- SMILES: CCCCCCC(OCC)=O

Properties
Chemical formula	C_{9}H_{18}O_{2}
Molar mass	158.241 g·mol^{−1}
Appearance	Colorless liquid
Odor	Grape
Density	0.860 g/cm^{3}
Melting point	−66 °C (−87 °F; 207 K)
Boiling point	188 to 189 °C (370 to 372 °F; 461 to 462 K)
- Except where otherwise noted, data are given for materials in their standard state (at 25 °C [77 °F], 100 kPa). verify (what is ?) Infobox references

Ethyl heptanoate is the ester resulting from the condensation of heptanoic acid and ethanol. Its chemical formula is CH_{3}(CH_{2})_{5}COOCH_{2}CH_{3}. It is a colorless liquid. It is used in the flavor industry because of its fruity odour that is similar to grape and pineapple (fruity, pineapple, cognac, rummy, winey, sweet).
