= Ethyl pentanoate =

Names
- Preferred IUPAC name Ethyl pentanoate
- Other names Ethyl valerate

Identifiers
CAS Number	539-82-2
3D model (JSmol)	Interactive image
ChEMBL	ChEMBL47483
ChemSpider	10420
ECHA InfoCard	100.007.934
EC Number	208-726-1
PubChem CID	10882
UNII	95R258T4P6
CompTox Dashboard (EPA)	DTXSID6040161
- InChI: InChI=1S/C7H14O2/c1-3-5-6-7(8)9-4-2/h3-6H2,1-2H3 Key: ICMAFTSLXCXHRK-UHFFFAOYSA-N; InChI=1/C7H14O2/c1-3-5-6-7(8)9-4-2/h3-6H2,1-2H3 Key: ICMAFTSLXCXHRK-UHFFFAOYAC
- SMILES: O=C(OCC)CCCC

Properties
Chemical formula	C_{7}H_{14}O_{2}
Molar mass	130.18 g/mol
Density	0.877 g/cm^{3} at 20 °C
Melting point	−91 °C (−132 °F; 182 K)
Boiling point	145 to 146 °C (293 to 295 °F; 418 to 419 K)
Solubility in water	2.21 mg/mL
Solubility	slightly soluble in ethanol
Refractive index (n_{D})	1.399-1.404

Hazards
- GHS labelling
Pictograms	(GHS02: Flammable)
Signal word	Warning
Hazard statements	H226
Precautionary statements	P210, P233, P240, P241, P242, P243, P280, P303+P361+P353, P370+P378, P403+P235, P501
NFPA 704 (fire diamond)	1 3
- Except where otherwise noted, data are given for materials in their standard state (at 25 °C [77 °F], 100 kPa). verify (what is ?) Infobox references

Ethyl pentanoate, also commonly known as ethyl valerate, is an organic compound used in flavors. It is an ester with the molecular formula C_{7}H_{14}O_{2}. It occurs naturally in fruits including apples, bananas, and strawberries as well as in fermented products such as cheese, whiskey, and cider.

== Properties ==
As is the case with most volatile esters, it has a pleasant aroma and taste. It is used as a food additive to impart a fruity flavour, particularly of apple (sweet, fruity, apple, pineapple, green, tropical). Its aroma is detectable at 1.5 to 6 ppb and taste at 30 ppm.

This colorless liquid is poorly soluble in water but miscible with organic solvents.

== Synthesis ==
Ethyl valerate is prepared by refluxing valeric acid and ethyl alcohol in the presence of concentrated sulfuric acid.

Enzymatic methods including microwave- and ultrasound-assisted syntheses have been investigated as alternatives.
