= Fatty acid ester =

Class of chemical compounds

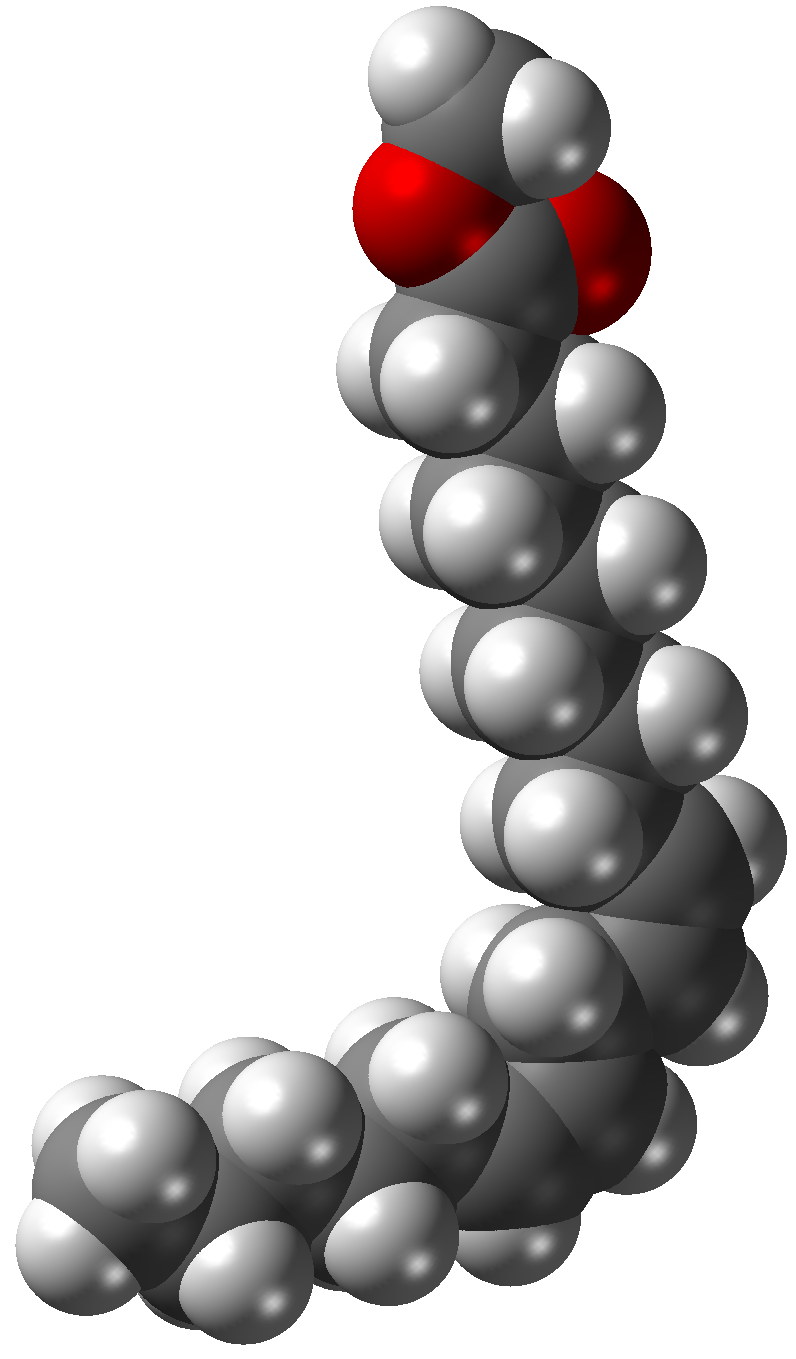
Space-filling model of methyl linoleate, or linoleic acid methyl ester, a common biodiesel component produced from the reaction of soybean or canola oil and methanol

Fatty acid esters (FAEs) are a type of ester that result from the combination of a fatty acid with an alcohol. When the alcohol component is glycerol, the fatty acid esters produced can be monoglycerides, diglycerides, or triglycerides. Dietary fats are chemically triglycerides.

Esters of fatty acids are colorless, although degraded samples are sometime appear to be yellow or even brown. The triglycerides are powders, flakes, coarse powders, or granular or waxy lumps, oils or liquids. They are almost odorless.

Biodiesels are typically fatty acid esters made by the transesterification of vegetable fats and oils. In this process the glycerol component is replaced with a different alcohol. The most commonly used alcohol is methanol, producing fatty acid methyl esters (FAME). Other alcohols used for the production of biodiesel include ethanol, butanol and isopropanol.

Fatty acid ethyl esters are also human biomarkers for the consumption of ethanol (alcoholic beverages).

== See also ==
- Fatty acid amide
- Omega-3-acid ethyl esters
