= Pentyl butyrate =

- Pentyl butyrate

Names
- Preferred IUPAC name Pentyl butanoate
- Other names Pentyl butyrate

Identifiers
CAS Number	540-18-1
3D model (JSmol)	Interactive image
ChemSpider	10428
ECHA InfoCard	100.007.946
EC Number	208-739-2
PubChem CID	10890
UNII	3Q2JP0VD8J
CompTox Dashboard (EPA)	DTXSID4041604
- InChI: InChI=1S/C9H18O2/c1-3-5-6-8-11-9(10)7-4-2/h3-8H2,1-2H3 Key: CFNJLPHOBMVMNS-UHFFFAOYSA-N; InChI=1/C9H18O2/c1-3-5-6-8-11-9(10)7-4-2/h3-8H2,1-2H3 Key: CFNJLPHOBMVMNS-UHFFFAOYAQ
- SMILES: CCCCCOC(=O)CCC

Properties
Chemical formula	C_{9}H_{18}O_{2}
Molar mass	158.24 g/mol
Odor	Apricot
Density	0.86 g/cm^{3}
Melting point	−73.2 °C (−99.8 °F; 200.0 K)
Boiling point	186 °C (367 °F; 459 K)
- Except where otherwise noted, data are given for materials in their standard state (at 25 °C [77 °F], 100 kPa). verify (what is ?) Infobox references

Pentyl butyrate, also known as pentyl butanoate or amyl butyrate, is an ester that is formed when pentanol is reacted with butyric acid, usually in the presence of sulfuric acid as a catalyst. This ester has a smell described as sweet, fruity, banana, pineapple, cherry, tropical. This chemical is used as an additive in cigarettes.
