= List of additives in cigarettes =

This is a static list of 599 additives that could be added to tobacco cigarettes in 1994. The ABC News program Day One first released the list to the public on March 7, 1994. It was submitted to the United States Department of Health and Human Services in April 1994. They are also listed in the 1998 Tobacco Master Settlement Agreement, which followed dozens of state-level lawsuits against tobacco companies known to have added additives to their cigarettes while deceiving the public about their addictive and deadly effects.

The list applies, as documented, only to American manufactured cigarettes intended for distribution within the United States by the listed companies. The five major tobacco companies that reported the information were:

- American Tobacco Company
- Brown and Williamson
- Liggett Group, Inc.
- Philip Morris Inc.
- R.J. Reynolds Tobacco Company

One significant issue is that while all these chemical compounds have been approved as additives to food, they were not tested by burning. Burning changes the properties of chemicals. Burning creates additional toxic compounds, including carcinogens. According to the U.S. National Cancer Institute: "Of the more than 7,000 chemicals in tobacco smoke, at least 250 are known to be harmful, including hydrogen cyanide, carbon monoxide, and ammonia. Among the 250 known harmful chemicals in tobacco smoke, at least 69 can cause cancer." See: Health effects of tobacco smoking and List of cigarette smoke carcinogens.

Although many of these additives are used in making cigarettes, each cigarette does not contain all of these additives. Some of these additives are found in cigarettes outside the USA too.

Some American brands are sold in other nations. For example: Marlboro, L&M, Winston, Chesterfield, Kent, and Newport.

== A ==
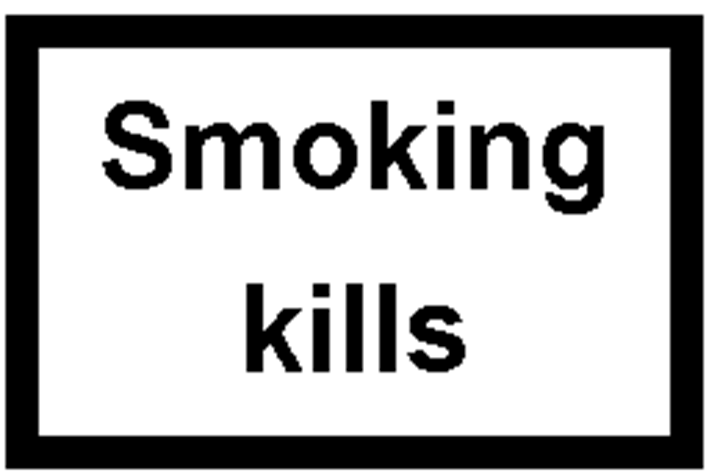
Typical tobacco packaging warning message about the health effect of smoking tobacco

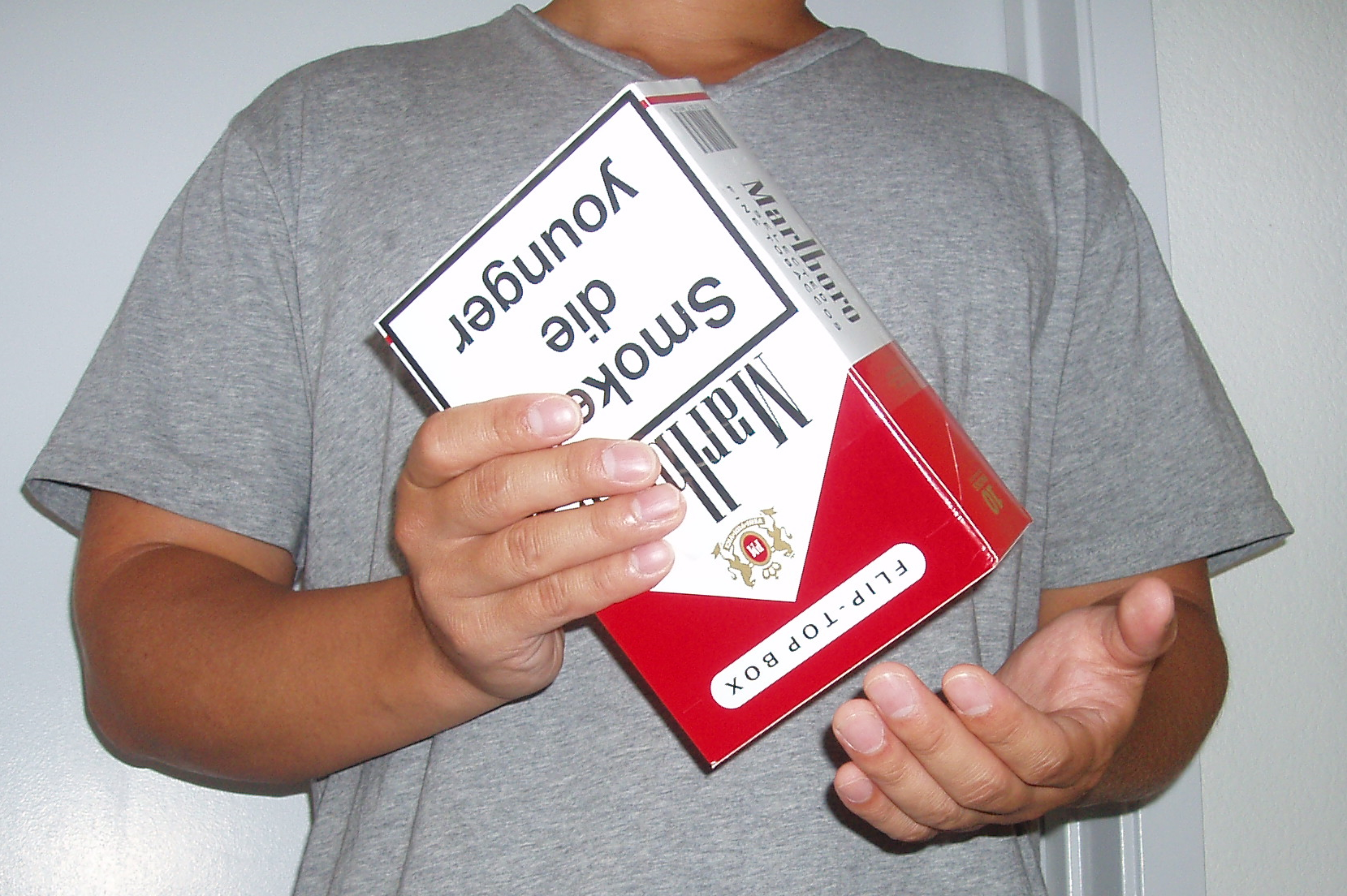
Big Marlboro box in San Francisco. "Smokers die younger."

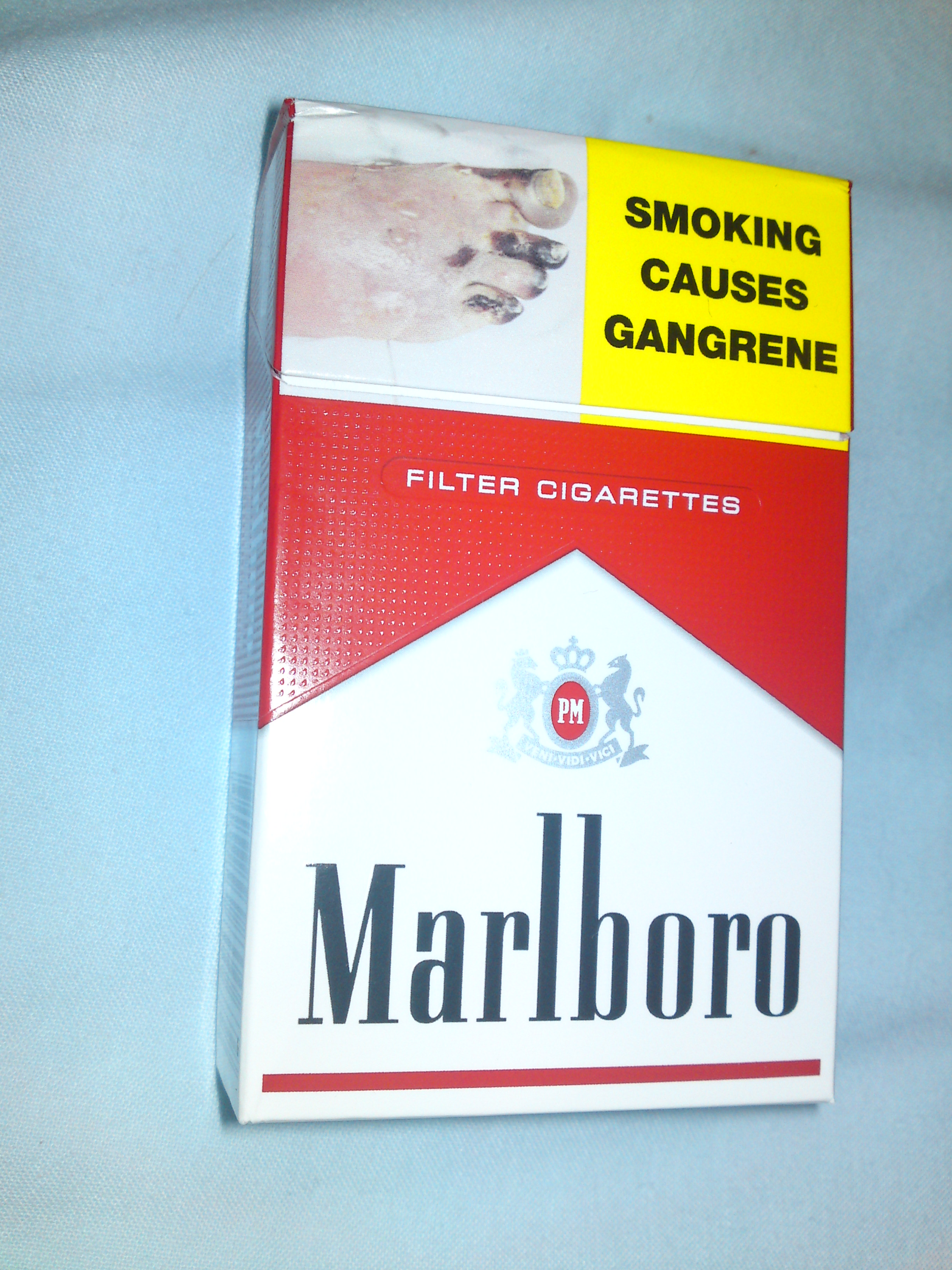
The front of a 20 pack of Marlboro Red cigarettes sold in New Zealand.

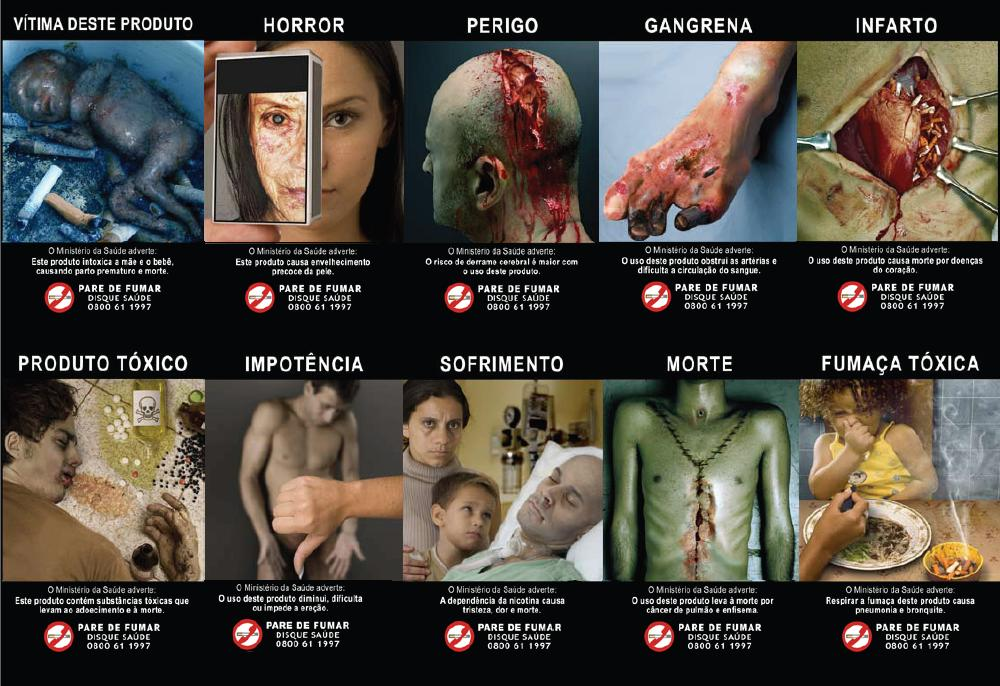
Brazil's third batch of graphic images (since replaced), mandatory on all cigarette packs.

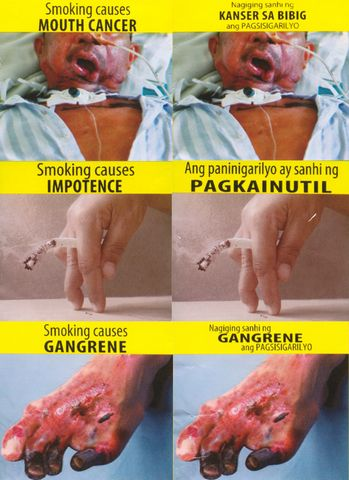
Philippines. Graphic tobacco packaging warning messages from 2016 to 2018.

- Acetanisole
- Acetic acid
- Acetoin
- Acetophenone
- 6-Acetoxydihydrotheaspirane
- 2-Acetyl-3-ethylpyrazine
- 2-Acetyl-5-methylfuran
- Acetylpyrazine
- 2-Acetylpyridine
- 3-Acetylpyridine
- 2-Acetylthiazole
- Aconitic acid
- dl-Alanine
- Alfalfa extract
- Allspice extract, oleoresin, and oil
- Allyl hexanoate
- Allyl ionone
- Almond bitter oil
- Ambergris tincture
- Ammonia
- Ammonium bicarbonate
- Ammonium hydroxide
- Ammonium sulfide
- Amyl alcohol
- Amyl butyrate
- Amyl formate
- Amyl octanoate
- alpha-Amylcinnamaldehyde
- Amyris oil
- trans-Anethole
- Angelica root extract, oil and seed oil
- Anise
- Anise star, extract and oils
- Anisyl acetate
- Anisyl alcohol
- Anisyl formate
- Anisyl phenylacetate
- Apple juice concentrate, extract, and skins
- Apricot extract and juice concentrate
- L-Arginine
- Asafetida fluid extract and oil
- Ascorbic acid
- L-Asparagine monohydrate
- L-Aspartic acid

== B ==
- Balsam of Peru and oil
- Basil oil
- Bay leaf, bay leaf oil, and sweet bay leaf oil
- Beeswax, white
- Beet juice concentrate
- Benzaldehyde
- Benzaldehyde glyceryl acetal
- Benzoic acid
- benzoin
- Benzoin resin
- Benzophenone
- Benzyl alcohol
- Benzyl benzoate
- Benzyl butyrate
- Benzyl cinnamate
- Benzyl propionate
- Benzyl salicylate
- Bergamot oil
- Bisabolene
- Black currant buds absolute
- Borneol
- Bornyl acetate
- Buchu leaf oil
- 1,3-Butanediol
- 2,3-Butanedione
- 1-Butanol
- 2-Butanone
- 4(2-Butenylidene)-3,5,5-trimethyl-2-cyclohexen-1-one
- Butter, butter esters, and butter oil
- Butyl acetate
- Butyl butyrate
- Butyl butyryl lactate
- Butyl isovalerate
- Butyl phenylacetate
- Butyl undecylenate
- 3-Butylidenephthalide
- Butyric acid

== C ==
- Cadinene
- Caffeine
- Calcium carbonate
- Camphene
- Cananga oil
- Capsicum oleoresin
- Caramel color
- Caraway oil
- Carbon dioxide
- Cardamom oleoresin, extract, seed oil, and powder
- Carob bean and extract
- beta-Carotene
- Carrot oil
- Carvacrol
- 4-Carvomenthenol
- L-Carvone
- beta-Caryophyllene
- beta-Caryophyllene oxide
- Cascarilla oil and bark extract
- Cassia bark oil
- Cassie absolute and oil
- Castoreum extract, tincture and absolute
- Cedar leaf oil
- Cedarwood oil terpenes and virginiana
- Cedrol
- Celery Seed extract, solid, oil, And oleoresin
- Cellulose fiber
- Chamomile flower oil and extract
- Chicory extract
- Chocolate
- Cinnamaldehyde
- Cinnamic acid
- Cinnamon leaf oil, bark oil, and extract
- Cinnamyl acetate
- Cinnamyl alcohol
- Cinnamyl cinnamate
- Cinnamyl isovalerate
- Cinnamyl propionate
- Citral
- Citric acid
- Citronella oil
- dl-Citronellol
- Citronellyl butyrate
- Citronellyl isobutyrate
- Civet absolute
- Clary Oil
- Clover tops, red solid extract
- Cocoa
- Cocoa shells, extract, distillate and powder
- Coconut oil
- Coffee
- Cognac white and green oil
- Copaiba oil
- Coriander extract and oil
- Corn oil
- Corn silk
- Costus root oil
- Cubeb oil
- Cuminaldehyde
- para-Cymene
- L-Cysteine

== D ==
- Dandelion root solid extract
- Davana oil
- 2-trans,4-trans-Decadienal
- delta-Decalactone
- gamma-Decalactone
- Decanal
- Decanoic acid
- 1-Decanol
- 2-Decenal
- Dehydromenthofurolactone
- Diacetyl
- Diammonium phosphate
- Diethyl malonate
- Diethyl sebacate
- 2,3-Diethylpyrazine
- Dihydro anethole
- 5,7-Dihydro-2-methylthieno(3,4-D) pyrimidine
- Dill seed oil and extract
- meta-Dimethoxybenzene
- para-Dimethoxybenzene
- 2,6-Dimethoxyphenol
- Dimethyl succinate
- 3,4-Dimethyl-1,2-cyclopentanedione
- 3,5-Dimethyl-1,2-cyclopentanedione
- 3,7-Dimethyl-1,3,6-octatriene
- 4,5-Dimethyl-3-hydroxy-2,5-dihydrofuran-2-one
- 6,10-Dimethyl-5,9-undecadien-2-one
- 3,7-Dimethyl-6-octenoic acid
- 2,4 Dimethylacetophenone
- alpha,para-Dimethylbenzyl alcohol
- alpha,alpha-Dimethylphenethyl acetate
- alpha,alpha-Dimethylphenethyl butyrate
- 2,3-Dimethylpyrazine
- 2,5-Dimethylpyrazine
- 2,6-Dimethylpyrazine
- Dimethyltetrahydrobenzofuranone
- delta-Dodecalactone
- gamma-Dodecalactone

== E ==
- para-Ethoxybenzaldehyde
- Ethyl 10-undecenoate
- Ethyl 2-methylbutyrate
- Ethyl acetate
- Ethyl acetoacetate
- Ethyl alcohol
- Ethyl benzoate
- Ethyl butyrate
- Ethyl cinnamate
- Ethyl decanoate
- Ethyl fenchol
- Ethyl furoate
- Ethyl heptanoate
- Ethyl hexanoate
- Ethyl isovalerate
- Ethyl lactate
- Ethyl laurate
- Ethyl levulinate
- Ethyl maltol
- Ethyl methylphenylglycidate
- Ethyl myristate
- Ethyl nonanoate
- Ethyl octadecanoate
- Ethyl octanoate
- Ethyl oleate
- Ethyl palmitate
- Ethyl phenylacetate
- Ethyl propionate
- Ethyl salicylate
- Ethyl trans-2-butenoate
- Ethyl valerate
- Ethyl vanillin
- 2-Ethyl (or methyl)-(3,5 and 6)-methoxypyrazine
- 2-Ethyl-1-Hexanol,3-ethyl-2-hydroxy-2-cyclopenten-1-one
- 2-Ethyl-3,(5 or 6)-dimethylpyrazine
- 5-Ethyl-3-hydroxy-4-methyl-2(5H)-furanone
- 2-Ethyl-3-methylpyrazine
- 3-Ethylpyridine
- 4-Ethylbenzaldehyde
- 4-Ethylguaiacol
- 4-Ethylphenol (para-ethylphenol)
- Eucalyptol

== F ==
- Farnesol
- D-Fenchone
- Fennel sweet oil
- Fenugreek, extract, resin, and absolute
- Fig juice concentrate
- Food starch modified
- Furfuryl Mercaptan
- 4-(2-Furyl)-3-buten-2-one

== G ==
- Galbanum oil
- Genet absolute
- Gentian root extract
- Geraniol
- Geranium rose oil
- Geranyl acetate
- Geranyl butyrate
- Geranyl formate
- Geranyl isovalerate
- Geranyl phenylacetate
- Ginger oil and oleoresin
- L-Glutamic acid
- L-Glutamine
- Glycerol
- Glycyrrhizin ammoniated
- Grape juice concentrate
- Guaiac wood oil
- Guaiacol
- Guar gum

== H ==
- 2,4-Heptadienal
- gamma-Heptalactone
- Heptanoic acid
- 2-Heptanone
- 3-Hepten-2-One
- 2-Hepten-4-One
- 4-Heptenal
- trans-2-Heptenal
- Heptyl acetate
- omega-6-Hexadecenlactone
- gamma-Hexalactone
- Hexanal
- Hexanoic acid
- 2-Hexen-1-Ol
- 3-Hexen-1-Ol
- cis-3-Hexen-1-yl acetate
- 2-Hexenal
- 3-Hexenoic acid
- trans-2-Hexenoic acid
- cis-3-Hexenyl formate
- Hexyl 2-methylbutyrate
- Hexyl acetate
- Hexyl alcohol
- Hexyl phenylacetate
- L-Histidine
- Honey
- Hops oil
- Hydrolyzed milk solids
- Hydrolyzed plant proteins
- 5-Hydroxy-2,4-decadienoic acid delta-lactone
- 4-Hydroxy-2,5-dimethyl-3(2H)-furanone
- 2-Hydroxy-3,5,5-trimethyl-2-cyclohexen-1-one
- 4-Hydroxy-3-pentenoic Acid lactone
- 2-Hydroxy-4-methylbenzaldehyde
- 4-Hydroxybutanoic acid lactone
- Hydroxycitronellal
- 6-Hydroxydihydrotheaspirane
- 4-(para-Hydroxyphenyl)-2-butanone
- Hyssop oil

== I ==
- Immortelle absolute and extract
- alpha-Ionone
- beta-Ionone
- alpha-Irone
- Isoamyl acetate
- Isoamyl benzoate
- Isoamyl butyrate
- Isoamyl cinnamate
- Isoamyl formate
- Isoamyl hexanoate
- Isoamyl isovalerate
- Isoamyl octanoate
- Isoamyl phenylacetate
- Isobornyl acetate
- Isobutyl acetate
- Isobutyl alcohol
- Isobutyl cinnamate
- Isobutyl phenylacetate
- Isobutyl salicylate
- 2-Isobutyl-3-methoxypyrazine
- alpha-Isobutyl phenethyl alcohol
- Isobutyraldehyde
- Isobutyric Acid
- d,l-Isoleucine
- alpha-Isomethyl ionone
- 2-Isopropylphenol
- Isovaleric acid

== J ==
- Jasmine absolute, concrete and oil

== K ==
- Kola nut extract

== L ==
- Labdanum absolute and oleoresin
- Lactic acid
- Lauric acid
- Lauric aldehyde
- Lavandin oil
- Lavender oil
- Lemon oil and extract
- Lemongrass oil
- L-Leucine
- Levulinic acid
- Liquorice root, fluid, extract and powder
- Lime Oil
- Linalool
- Linalool oxide
- Linalyl acetate
- Linden flowers
- Lovage oil and extract
- L-Lysine

== M ==
- Mace powder, extract and oil
- Magnesium carbonate
- Malic acid
- Malt and malt extract
- Maltodextrin
- Maltol
- Maltyl isobutyrate
- Mandarin oil
- Maple syrup and concentrate
- Mate leaf, absolute and oil
- para-Mentha-8-Thiol-3-One
- Menthol
- Menthone
- Menthyl acetate
- dl-Methionine
- Methoprene
- 2-Methoxy-4-methylphenol
- 2-Methoxy-4-vinylphenol
- para-Methoxybenzaldehyde
- 1-(para-Methoxyphenyl)-1-penten-3-one
- 4-(para-Methoxyphenyl)-2-butanone
- 1-(para-Methoxyphenyl)-2-propanone
- Methoxypyrazine
- Methyl 2-furoate
- Methyl 2-octynoate
- Methyl 2-pyrrolyl ketone
- Methyl anisate
- Methyl anthranilate
- Methyl benzoate
- Methyl cinnamate
- Methyl dihydrojasmonate
- Methyl ester of rosin, partially hydrogenated
- Methyl isovalerate
- Methyl linoleate (48%)
- Methyl linolenate (52%) mixture
- Methyl naphthyl ketone
- Methyl nicotinate
- Methyl phenylacetate
- Methyl salicylate
- Methyl sulfide
- 3-Methyl-1-cyclopentadecanone
- 4-Methyl-1-phenyl-2-pentanone
- 5-Methyl-2-phenyl-2-hexenal
- 5-Methyl-2-thiophenecarboxaldehyde
- 6-Methyl-3,-5-heptadien-2-one
- 2-Methyl-3-(para-isopropylphenyl) propionaldehyde
- 5-Methyl-3-hexen-2-one
- 1-Methyl-3-methoxy-4-isopropylbenzene
- 4-Methyl-3-pentene-2-one
- 2-Methyl-4-phenylbutyraldehyde
- 6-methyl-5-hepten-2-one
- 4-Methyl-5-thiazoleethanol
- 4-Methyl-5-vinylthiazole
- Methyl-alpha-ionone
- Methyl-trans-2-butenoic acid
- 4-Methylacetophenone
- para-Methylanisole
- alpha-Methylbenzyl acetate
- alpha-Methylbenzyl alcohol
- 2-Methylbutyraldehyde
- 3-Methylbutyraldehyde
- 2-Methylbutyric acid
- alpha-Methylcinnamaldehyde
- Methylcyclopentenolone
- 2-Methylheptanoic acid
- 2-Methylhexanoic acid
- 3-Methylpentanoic acid
- 4-Methylpentanoic acid
- 2-Methylpyrazine
- 5-Methylquinoxaline
- 2-Methyltetrahydrofuran-3-one
- (Methylthio)Methylpyrazine (mixture of isomers)
- 3-Methylthiopropionaldehyde
- Methyl 3-methylthiopropionate
- 2-Methylvaleric acid
- Mimosa absolute and extract
- Molasses extract and tincture
- Mountain maple solid extract
- Mullein flowers
- Myristaldehyde
- Myristic acid
- Myrrh oil

== N ==
- beta-Napthyl ethyl ether
- Nerol
- Neroli bigarde oil
- Nerolidol
- Nona-2-trans,6-cis-dienal
- 2,6-Nonadien-1-ol
- gamma-Nonalactone
- Nonanal
- Nonanoic acid
- Nonanone
- trans-2-Nonen-1-ol
- 2-Nonenal
- Nonyl acetate
- Nutmeg powder and oil

== O ==
- Oak chips extract and oil
- Oakmoss absolute
- 9,12-Octadecadienoic acid (48%) and 9,12,15-octadecatrienoic acid (52%)
- delta-Octalactone
- gamma-Octalactone
- Octanal
- Octanoic acid
- 1-Octanol
- 2-Octanone
- 3-Octen-2-one
- 1-Octen-3-ol
- 1-Octen-3-yl acetate
- 2-Octenal
- Octyl isobutyrate
- Oleic acid
- Olibanum oil
- Opoponax oil and gum
- Orange blossom water, absolute, and leaf absolute
- Orange oil and extract
- Origanum oil
- Orris concrete oil and root extract

== P ==
- Palmarosa oil
- Palmitic acid
- Parsley seed oil
- Patchouli oil
- omega-Pentadecalactone
- 2,3-Pentanedione
- 2-Pentanone
- 4-Pentenoic acid
- 2-Pentylpyridine
- Pepper oil, black and white
- Peppermint oil
- Peruvian (Bois de Rose) oil
- Petitgrain absolute, Mandarin oil, and terpeneless oil
- alpha-Phellandrene
- 2-Phenenthyl acetate
- Phenethyl alcohol
- Phenethyl butyrate
- Phenethyl cinnamate
- Phenethyl isobutyrate
- Phenethyl isovalerate
- Phenethyl phenylacetate
- Phenethyl salicylate
- 1-Phenyl-1-propanol
- 3-Phenyl-1-propanol
- 2-Phenyl-2-butenal
- 4-Phenyl-3-buten-2-ol
- 4-Phenyl-3-buten-2-one
- Phenylacetaldehyde
- Phenylacetic acid
- L-Phenylalanine
- 3-Phenylpropionaldehyde
- 3-Phenylpropionic acid
- 3-Phenylpropyl acetate
- 3-Phenylpropyl cinnamate
- 2-(3-Phenylpropyl)Tetrahydrofuran
- Phosphoric acid
- Pimenta leaf oil
- Pine needle oil
- Pine oil, Scotch
- Pineapple juice concentrate
- alpha-Pinene, beta-Pinene
- D-Piperitone
- Piperonal
- Pipsissewa leaf extract
- Plum juice
- Potassium sorbate
- L-Proline
- Propenylguaethol
- Propionic acid
- Propyl acetate
- Propyl para-hydroxybenzoate
- Propylene glycol
- 3-Propylidenephthalide
- Prune juice and concentrate
- Pyridine
- Pyroligneous acid and extract
- Pyrrole
- Pyruvic acid

== R ==
- Raisin juice concentrate
- Rhodinol
- Rose absolute and oil
- Rosemary oil
- Rum
- Rum ether
- Rye extract

== S ==
- Sage, sage oil, and sage oleoresin
- Salicylaldehyde
- Sandalwood oil, yellow
- Sclareolide
- Skatole
- Smoke flavor
- Snakeroot oil
- Sodium acetate
- Sodium benzoate
- Sodium bicarbonate
- Sodium carbonate
- Sodium chloride
- Sodium citrate
- Sodium hydroxide
- Solanone
- Spearmint oil
- Styrax extract, gum and oil
- Sucrose octaacetate
- Sugar alcohols
- Sugars

== T ==
- Tagetes oil
- Tannic acid
- Tartaric acid
- Tea leaf and absolute
- alpha-Terpineol
- Terpinolene
- Terpinyl acetate
- 5,6,7,8-Tetrahydroquinoxaline
- 1,5,5,9-Tetramethyl-13-oxatricyclo(8.3.0.0(4,9))tridecane
- 2,3,4,5- and 3,4,5,6-Tetramethylethyl-cyclohexanone
- 2,3,5,6-Tetramethylpyrazine
- Thiamine hydrochloride
- Thiazole
- L-Threonine
- Thyme oil, white and red
- Thymol
- Tobacco extracts
- Tocopherols (mixed)
- Tolu balsam gum and extract
- Tolualdehydes
- para-Tolyl 3-methylbutyrate
- para-Tolyl acetaldehyde
- para-Tolyl acetate
- para-Tolyl isobutyrate
- para-Tolyl phenylacetate
- Triacetin
- 2-Tridecanone
- 2-Tridecenal
- Triethyl citrate
- 3,5,5-Trimethyl-1-hexanol
- para,alpha,alpha-Trimethylbenzyl alcohol
- 4-(2,6,6-Trimethylcyclohex-1-enyl)but-2-en-4-one
- 2,6,6-Trimethylcyclohex-2-ene-1,4-dione
- 2,6,6-Trimethylcyclohexa-1,3-dienyl methanal
- 4-(2,6,6-Trimethylcyclohexa-1,3-dienyl)but-2-en-4-one
- 2,2,6-Trimethylcyclohexanone
- 2,3,5-Trimethylpyrazine
- L-Tyrosine

== U ==
- delta-Undecalactone
- gamma-Undecalactone
- Undecanal
- 2-Undecanone
- 10-Undecenal
- Urea

== V ==
- Valencene
- Valeraldehyde
- Valerian root extract, oil, and powder
- Valeric acid
- gamma-Valerolactone
- Valine
- Vanilla extract and oleoresin
- Vanillin
- Veratraldehyde
- Vetiver oil
- Vinegar
- Violet leaf absolute

== W ==
- Walnut hull extract
- Water
- Wheat extract and flour
- Wild cherry bark extract
- Wine and wine sherry

== X ==
- Xanthan gum
- 3,4-Xylenol

== Y ==
- Yeast

== See also ==
- List of food additives
- List of cigarette smoke carcinogens
- Health effects of tobacco smoking
- Tobacco harm reduction
- Composition of electronic cigarette aerosol
- Tobacco packaging warning messages
