= C9H10O =

The molecular formula C_{9}H_{10}O (molar mass: 134.17 g/mol) may refer to:

- Allyl phenyl ether
- Anol
- Chavicol
- Chromane
- Cinnamyl alcohol
- 4-Ethylbenzaldehyde
- Hydrocinnamaldehyde
- Indanols
- 4-Methylacetophenone
- Phenylacetone
- Propiophenone
- 4-Vinylanisole
