= C6H6N2O =

The molecular formula C_{6}H_{6}N_{2}O may refer to:

- Acetylpyrazine, an organic compound; a pyrazine and a ketone
- Isonicotinamide, the amide form of isonicotinic acid; an isomer of nicotinamide
- Nicotinamide, a form of vitamin B3 found in food, used as a dietary supplement and medication
