= IBMP =

IBMP may refer to:

- 3-isobutyl-2-methoxypyrazine; see methoxypyrazines
- Russian Institute for Biomedical Problems or Institute of Biomedical Problems (ru:Институт медико-биологических проблем РАН), known for the MARS-500 experiment simulating crewed flight to Mars; cf. Russian Academy of Sciences#Institutions
- International Breast Milk Project
