= C9H14N2O =

The molecular formula C_{9}H_{14}N_{2}O (molar mass: 166.22 g/mol, exact mass: 166.1106 u) may refer to:

- ABT-418
- 3-Isobutyl-2-methoxypyrazine
- Phenoxypropazine
