= C28H56O2 =

The molecular formula C_{28}H_{56}O_{2} may refer to:

- Montanic acid
- Myristyl myristate
