= Isopropyl methoxypyrazine =

- Chemical structure of isopropyl methoxy pyrazine

Names
- Preferred IUPAC name 2-Methoxy-3-(propan-2-yl)pyrazine
- Other names 2-Isopropyl-3-methoxypyrazine

Identifiers
CAS Number	25773-40-4
3D model (JSmol)	Interactive image
ChemSpider	30649
ECHA InfoCard	100.042.946
PubChem CID	33166
UNII	1FL7L111A6
CompTox Dashboard (EPA)	DTXSID4067147
- InChI: InChI=1S/C8H12N2O/c1-6(2)7-8(11-3)10-5-4-9-7/h4-6H,1-3H3 Key: NTOPKICPEQUPPH-UHFFFAOYSA-N; InChI=1/C8H12N2O/c1-6(2)7-8(11-3)10-5-4-9-7/h4-6H,1-3H3 Key: NTOPKICPEQUPPH-UHFFFAOYAE
- SMILES: CC(C)C1=NC=CN=C1OC

Properties
Chemical formula	C_{8}H_{12}N_{2}O
Molar mass	152.19 g/mol

Hazards
- GHS labelling
Pictograms	(GHS07: Exclamation mark)
Signal word	Warning
Hazard statements	H315, H319, H335
Precautionary statements	P302+P352, P305+P351+P338
- Except where otherwise noted, data are given for materials in their standard state (at 25 °C [77 °F], 100 kPa). verify (what is ?) Infobox references

Isopropyl methoxypyrazine (IPMP) is a methoxypyrazine, a class of chemical compounds that produce odors. The odor is rather undesirable and is produced by the Asian lady beetle or by the actinomycete Streptomyces sp, and yeast, specifically Saccharomyces cerevisiae. It can be detected by human taste at concentrations of as low as 2 nanograms per litre.

== Presence in wine grapes ==
The odor of IPMP tends to be undesirable in the case of certain wines.

Cabernet Sauvignon has high levels of methoxypyrazines. Two methoxypyrazine compounds, 3-isobutyl-2-methoxypyrazine (IBMP) and 3-isopropyl-2-methoxypyrazine, are considered to be important determinants of green flavours in Sauvignon blanc wines.

== Presence in coffee ==
IPMP is also an important flavour compound in coffee and is responsible for causing an off-taste called "potato taste" in East African coffee. The insects Antestiopsis are also implicated in causing the taste.

== See also ==
- Alkylpyrazines
