= C16H26O2 =

The molecular formula C_{16}H_{26}O_{2} (molar mass: 250.382 g/mol) may refer to:

- Hiragonic acid
- Sclareolide
