= C13H22O =

The molecular formula C_{13}H_{22}O (molar mass: 194.31 g/mol) may refer to:

- Solanone
- Geranylacetone
- Ambrinol 95
