= Trimyristin =

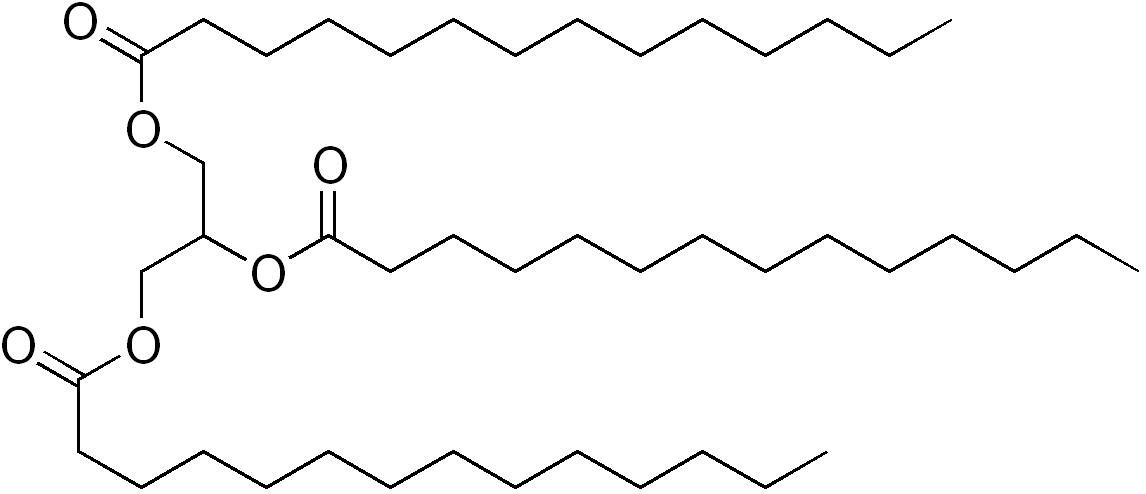
- Skeletal formula of trimyristin

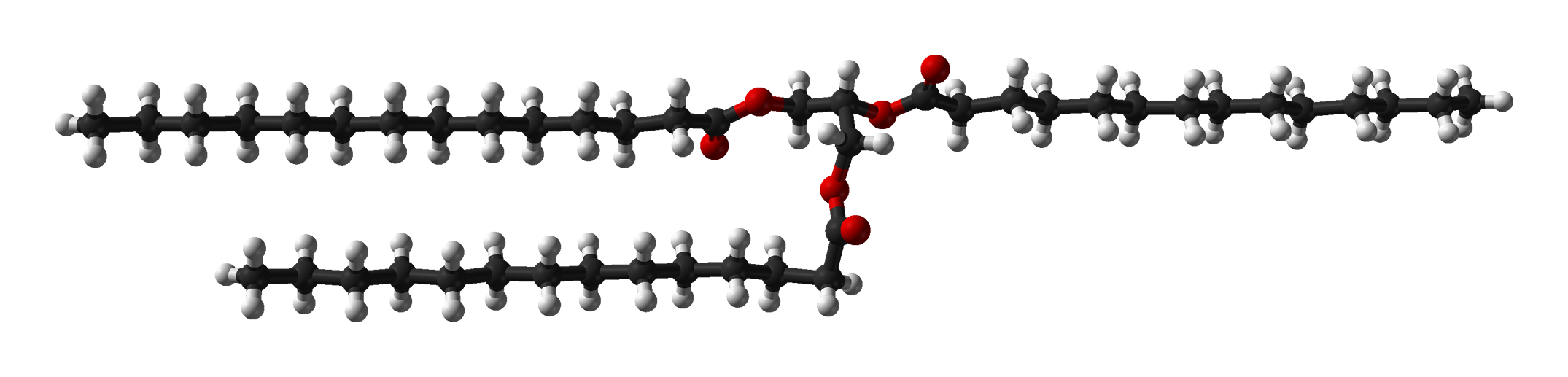
- Ball-and-stick model of trimyristin

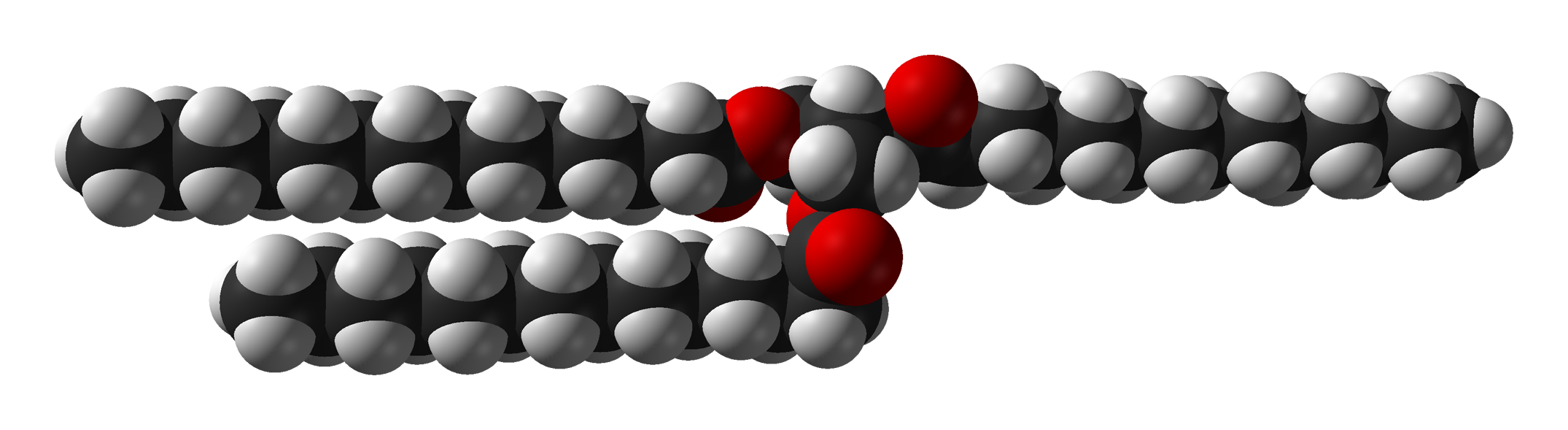
- Space-filling model of trimyristin

Names
- Systematic IUPAC name Propane-1,2,3-triyl tri(tetradecanoate)
- Other names Glyceryl trimyristate; Glycerol tritetradecanoate; 1,2,3-Tritetradecanoylglycerol

Identifiers
CAS Number	555-45-3
3D model (JSmol)	Interactive image
ChemSpider	10675
ECHA InfoCard	100.008.273
EC Number	209-099-7
PubChem CID	11148
UNII	18L31PSR28
CompTox Dashboard (EPA)	DTXSID701014651
- InChI: InChI=1S/C45H86O6/c1-4-7-10-13-16-19-22-25-28-31-34-37-43(46)49-40-42(51-45(48)39-36-33-30-27-24-21-18-15-12-9-6-3)41-50-44(47)38-35-32-29-26-23-20-17-14-11-8-5-2/h42H,4-41H2,1-3H3 Key: DUXYWXYOBMKGIN-UHFFFAOYSA-N; InChI=1/C45H86O6/c1-4-7-10-13-16-19-22-25-28-31-34-37-43(46)49-40-42(51-45(48)39-36-33-30-27-24-21-18-15-12-9-6-3)41-50-44(47)38-35-32-29-26-23-20-17-14-11-8-5-2/h42H,4-41H2,1-3H3 Key: DUXYWXYOBMKGIN-UHFFFAOYAC
- SMILES: CCCCCCCCCCCCCC(=O)OCC(COC(=O)CCCCCCCCCCCCC)OC(=O)CCCCCCCCCCCCC

Properties
Chemical formula	C_{45}H_{86}O_{6}
Molar mass	723.177 g·mol^{−1}
Appearance	White-yellowish gray solid
Odor	Odorless
Density	0.862 g/cm^{3} (20 °C); 0.8848 g/cm^{3} (60 °C)
Melting point	56–57 °C (133–135 °F; 329–330 K) at 760 mmHg
Boiling point	311 °C (592 °F; 584 K) at 760 mmHg
Solubility	Slightly soluble in alcohol, ligroin Soluble in diethyl ether, acetone, benzene, dichloromethane, chloroform, TBME
Refractive index (n_{D})	1.4428 (60 °C)

Structure
Crystal structure	Triclinic (β-form)
Space group	P1̅ (β-form)
Lattice constant	a = 12.0626 Å, b = 41.714 Å, c = 5.4588 Å (β-form) α = 73.888°, β = 100.408°, γ = 118.274°

Thermochemistry
Heat capacity (C)	1013.6 J/mol·K (β-form, 261.9 K); 1555.2 J/mol·K (331.5 K)
Std molar entropy (S^{⦵}_{298})	1246 J/mol·K (liquid)
Std enthalpy of formation (Δ_{f}H^{⦵}_{298})	−2355 kJ/mol
Std enthalpy of combustion (Δ_{c}H^{⦵}_{298})	27643.7 kJ/mol

Hazards
NFPA 704 (fire diamond)	1 0 0
Flash point	> 110 °C (230 °F; 383 K)
Autoignition temperature	421.1 °C (790.0 °F; 694.2 K)
- Except where otherwise noted, data are given for materials in their standard state (at 25 °C [77 °F], 100 kPa). verify (what is ?) Infobox references

Trimyristin is a saturated fat and the triglyceride of myristic acid with the chemical formula C_{45}H_{86}O_{6}. Trimyristin is a white to yellowish-gray solid that is insoluble in water, but soluble in ethanol, acetone, benzene, chloroform, dichloromethane, ether, and TBME.

== Occurrence ==
Trimyristin is found naturally in many vegetable fats and oils.

=== Isolation from nutmeg ===
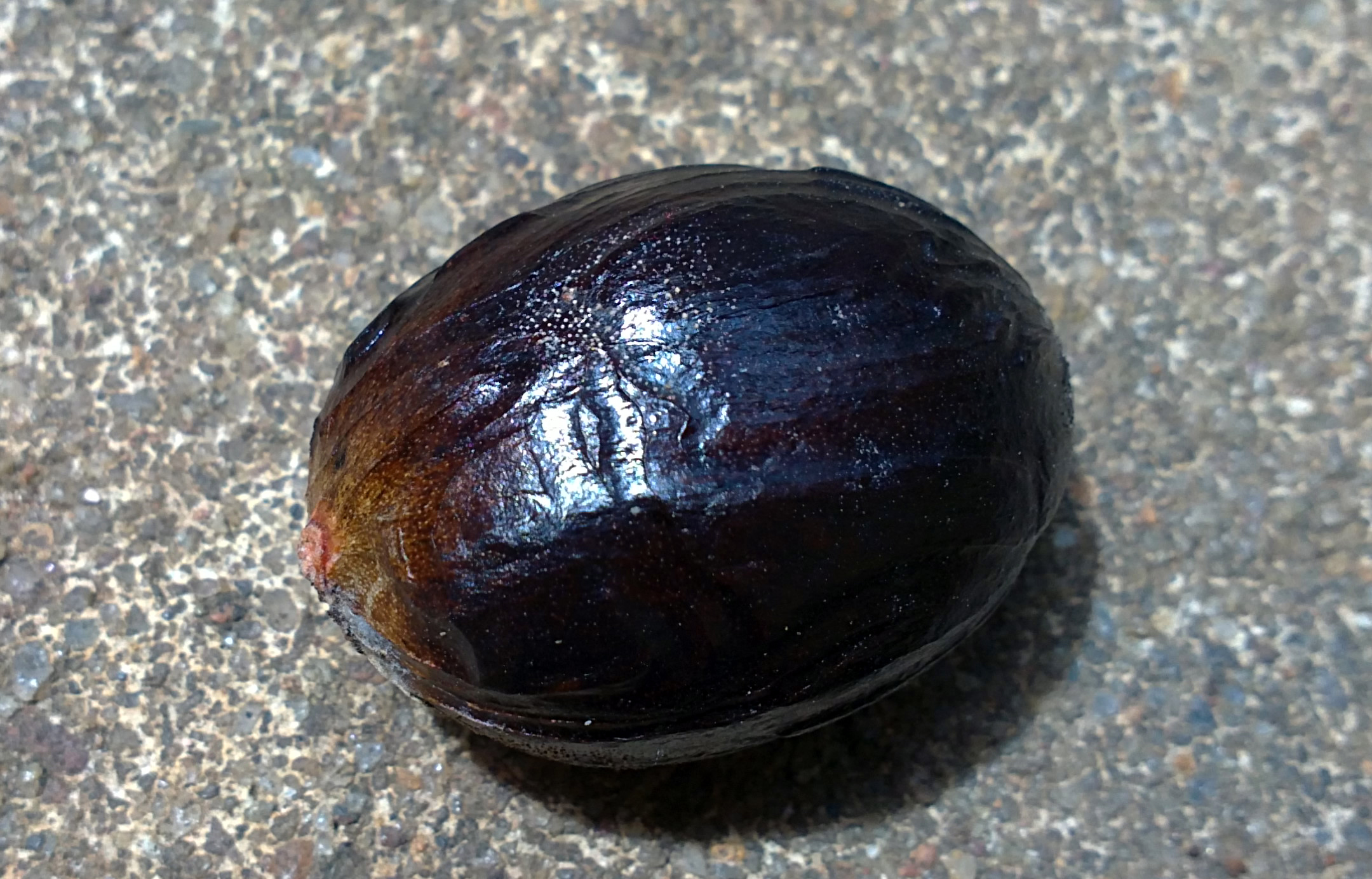
Seed of nutmeg contains trimyristin

The isolation of trimyristin from powdered nutmeg is a common introductory-level exercise in organic chemistry courses. It is an uncommonly simple natural product extraction because nutmeg oil generally consists of over 80% trimyristin. Trimyristin makes up between 20–25% of the mass of dried, ground nutmeg. Separation is generally carried out by steam distillation and purification uses extraction from ether followed by distillation or rotary evaporation to remove the volatile solvent. The extraction of trimyristin can also be done with diethyl ether at room temperature, due to its high solubility in the ether. The experiment is frequently included in curricula, both for its relative ease and to provide instruction in these techniques. Trimyristin can then be used to prepare myristic acid or one of its salts as an example of saponification.

== See also ==
- Linolein
