= Linolein =

- Linolein

Names
- IUPAC name Tri-O-[(9Z,12Z)-octadeca-9,12-dienoyl]glycerol
- Systematic IUPAC name Propane-1,2,3-triyl tri[(9Z,12Z)-octadeca-9,12-dienoate]
- Other names Trilinolein; Glyceryl trilinoleate; Glycerol trilinoleate

Identifiers
CAS Number	537-40-6
3D model (JSmol)	Interactive image
ChemSpider	4479674
ECHA InfoCard	100.007.880
PubChem CID	5322095
UNII	V5LJ52OGS7
CompTox Dashboard (EPA)	DTXSID1042653
- InChI: InChI=1S/C57H98O6/c1-4-7-10-13-16-19-22-25-28-31-34-37-40-43-46-49-55(58)61-52-54(63-57(60)51-48-45-42-39-36-33-30-27-24-21-18-15-12-9-6-3)53-62-56(59)50-47-44-41-38-35-32-29-26-23-20-17-14-11-8-5-2/h16-21,25-30,54H,4-15,22-24,31-53H2,1-3H3/b19-16-,20-17-,21-18-,28-25-,29-26-,30-27- Key: HBOQXIRUPVQLKX-BBWANDEASA-N
- SMILES: CCCCC/C=C\C/C=C\CCCCCCCC(=O)OCC(OC(=O)CCCCCCC/C=C\C/C=C\CCCCC)COC(=O)CCCCCCC/C=C\C/C=C\CCCCC

Properties
Chemical formula	C_{57}H_{98}O_{6}
Molar mass	879.405 g·mol^{−1}
Density	0.925 g/mL at 20 °C
- Except where otherwise noted, data are given for materials in their standard state (at 25 °C [77 °F], 100 kPa). verify (what is ?) Infobox references

Linolein is a triglyceride in which glycerol is esterified with linoleic acid. It's a primary constituent of sunflower oil and multiple other vegetable fats. It is used in the manufacturing of biodiesel. Linolein is also an ingredient in some cosmetic products.

== See also ==
- Trimyristin
