= 2-Hydroxy-4-methylbenzaldehyde =

Names
- Preferred IUPAC name 2-Hydroxy-4-methylbenzaldehyde
- Other names 4-Methylsalicylaldehyde

Identifiers
CAS Number	698-27-1
3D model (JSmol)	Interactive image
ChEBI	CHEBI:178982
ChemSpider	55144
ECHA InfoCard	100.010.741
EC Number	211-813-7
PubChem CID	61200
UNII	9N0S26G61J
CompTox Dashboard (EPA)	DTXSID2074407
- InChI: InChI=1S/C8H8O2/c1-6-2-3-7(5-9)8(10)4-6/h2-5,10H,1H3 Key: JODRRPJMQDFCBJ-UHFFFAOYSA-N
- SMILES: CC1=CC(=C(C=C1)C=O)O

Properties
Chemical formula	C_{8}H_{8}O_{2}
Molar mass	136.150 g·mol^{−1}

Hazards
- GHS labelling
Pictograms	(GHS07: Exclamation mark)
Signal word	Warning
Hazard statements	H302
Precautionary statements	P261, P264, P264+P265, P270, P271, P280, P301+P317, P302+P352, P304+P340, P305+P351+P338, P319, P321, P330, P332+P317, P337+P317, P362+P364, P403+P233, P405, P501
- Except where otherwise noted, data are given for materials in their standard state (at 25 °C [77 °F], 100 kPa). Infobox references

2-Hydroxy-4-methylbenzaldehyde is a chemical compound. It is an additive in cigarettes.
