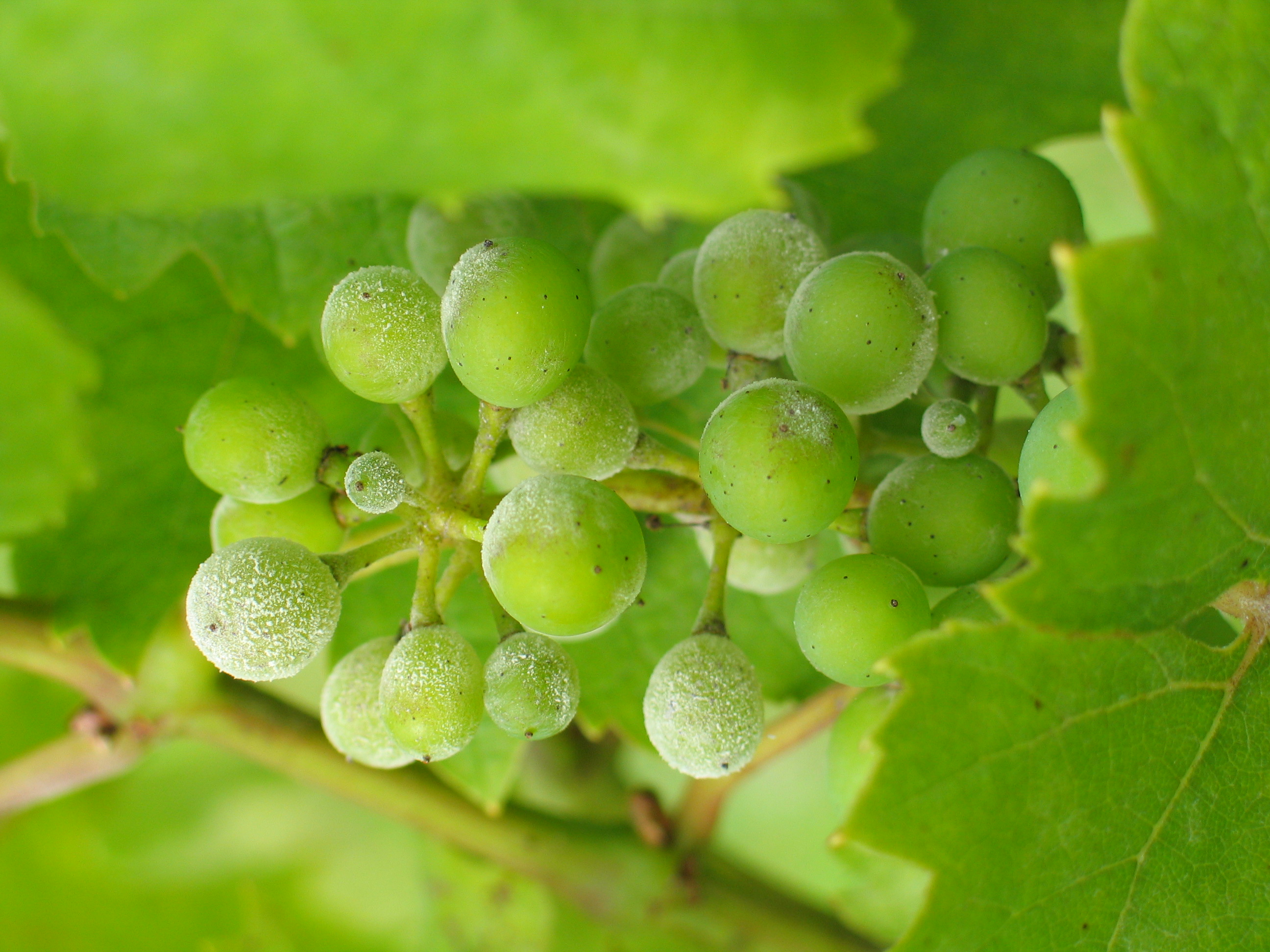

Scientific classification
- Kingdom: Fungi
- Division: Ascomycota
- Class: Leotiomycetes
- Order: Helotiales
- Family: Erysiphaceae
- Genus: Erysiphe
- Species: E. necator

Binomial name
- Erysiphe necator Schwein., 1832

Synonyms
- Uncinula necator (Schwein.) Burrill, 1892

= Erysiphe necator =

Species of fungus

Erysiphe necator, synonym Uncinula necator, is a fungus that causes powdery mildew of grape. It is a common pathogen of Vitis species, including the wine grape, Vitis vinifera. The fungus is believed to have originated in North America. European varieties of Vitis vinifera are more or less susceptible to this fungus. Erysiphe necator infects all green tissue on the grapevine, including leaves and young berries. It can cause crop loss and poor wine quality if untreated. The sexual stage of this pathogen requires free moisture to release ascospores from its cleistothecia in the spring. However, free moisture is not needed for secondary spread via conidia; high atmospheric humidity is sufficient.

It produces common odors such as 1-octen-3-one and (Z)-1,5-octadien-3-one.

This mildew can be treated with sulfur or fungicides; however resistance to several chemical classes such as Benomyl, the DMIs, and Strobilurins has developed. While synthetic fungicides are often recommended as applications around bloom, it is common to include sulfur in a tank mix to help with resistance management.

== Summary ==
Powdery mildews are generally host-specific, and powdery mildew of grape is caused by a host-specific pathogen named Erysiphe necator. Powdery mildew is a polycylic disease that thrives in warm, moist environments. Its symptoms are widely recognizable and include gray-white fungal growth on the surface of infected plants. A sulfur formulation, fungicides, and limiting the environmental factors that favor the growth of powdery mildews are all practices that can stall and/or halt its growth.

== Hosts and symptoms ==
Powdery mildews are generally host-specific. Erysiphe necator is the pathogen that causes powdery mildew on grape. The most susceptible hosts of this pathogen are members of the genus Vitis. The signs of powdery mildews are widely recognizable and easily identifiable. The majority of them can be found on the uppersides of the leaves; however, it can also infect the undersides, buds, flowers, young fruit, and young stems. A gray-white, dusty, fungal growth consisting of mycelia, conidia and conidiophores coat much of the infected plant. Chasmothecia, which are the overwintering structures, present themselves as tiny, spherical fruiting structures that go from white, to yellowish-brown to black in color, and are about the size of the head of a pin. Symptoms that occur as a result of the infection include necrosis, stunting, leaf curling, and a decrease in quality of the fruit produced.

== Disease cycle ==
Powdery mildew is a polycyclic disease (one which produces a secondary inoculum) that initially infects the leaf surface with primary inoculum, which is conidia from mycelium, or secondary inoculum, which is an overwintering structure called a chasmothecium. When the disease begins to develop, it looks like a white powdery substance.

The primary inoculum process begins with an ascogonium (female) and antheridium (male) joining to produce an offspring. This offspring, a young chasmothecium, is used to infect the host immediately or overwinter on the host to infect when the timing is right (typically in spring). To infect, it produces a conidiophore that then bears conidia. These conidia move along to a susceptible surface to germinate. Once these spores germinate, they produce a structure called a haustoria, capable of "sucking" nutrients from the plant cells directly under the epidermis of the leaf. At this point, the fungi can infect leaves, buds and twigs that then reinfect other plants or further infect the current host. From this point, you see more white powdery signs of powdery mildew, and these structures produce secondary inoculum to reinfect the host with mycelium and conidia, or use the mycelium to produce primary inoculum to another plant.

For germination to occur using a chasmothecium, the chasmothecium must be exposed to the right environmental conditions to rupture the structure to thereby release spores in hope that they'll germinate. Germination of conidia occurs at temperatures between 7 and 31 °C and is inhibited above 33 °C. Germination is greatest at 30–100% relative humidity.

== Environment ==
Powdery Mildew thrives in warm, moist environments and infects younger plant tissues like fruit, leaves, and green stems and buds. Free water can disrupt conidia and only requires a humid microclimate for infection. Most infection begins when spring rain (2.5mm) falls and temperatures are approximately 15 °C or higher. Rates of infection decline at temperatures higher than 30 °C, since the evaporation of water occurs readily. Cooler conditions, such as shading and poor aeration, promote infection due to a higher relative humidity, optimally 85% or greater. However, sporulation does occur at levels as low as 40%. Spores are dispersed mostly by wind and rain splash.

Young underdeveloped tissues are most susceptible to infection, primarily leaves and fruit. Warmer weather cultivars of Vitis vinifera and French hybrids provide overwintering protection in buds and during moderate winters climates. American cultivars are generally less susceptible to infection unless an unusually warm winter does not kill the chasmothecia in buds. Most chasmothecia survive on the vine where ample protection is provided in the bark.

== Management ==
First and foremost, limiting environmental factors that promote infection are key to managing powdery mildew on grapes. Optimal sites feature full sun on all grape structures and ample aeration to reduce humid microclimates under shading leaves. Pruning vines and clusters and planting on a gentle slope and orienting in rows running North and South promote full sun and aeration. Dusting leaves and berries with lime and sulfur was effective in the 1850s during the epidemic in Europe.

Current organic agricultural practices still use a sulfur formulation as a treatment for powdery mildew. However, some cultivars like Concord are susceptible to phytotoxic damage with sulfur use. Since the fungus grows on tissue surfaces rather than inside epithelial cells, topical applications of oils and other compounds are recommended. Integrated pest management programs are utilized by organic and conventional agriculture systems, while the latter prescribes the addition of fungicides.

Typical applications of fungicides occur during prebloom and for 2–4 weeks post bloom. If the previous year was a conducive environment for infection or the current year had a warm winter, earlier sprays are recommended due to a potentially higher amount of overwintered chasmothecia. If warm and humid, conidia are produced every 5–7 days throughout the growing season. To limit powdery mildew resistance, growers alternate treatments by employing multiple modes of action.

== Importance ==
The disease affects grapes worldwide, leaving all agricultural grape businesses at risk of Erysiphe necator. Powdery mildew of grape affects the size of the vines, the total yield of fruit, as well as affecting the taste of wine produced from infected grapes. The disease can also cause the blossoms to fall and result in failure to produce fruit.
