= Acetylpyrazine =

Names
- Preferred IUPAC name 1-(Pyrazin-2-yl)ethan-1-one
- Other names 2-Acetylpyrazine

Identifiers
CAS Number	22047-25-2
3D model (JSmol)	Interactive image
ChEBI	CHEBI:145236
ChemSpider	28682
ECHA InfoCard	100.040.670
PubChem CID	30914
UNII	GR391IBU5C
CompTox Dashboard (EPA)	DTXSID5047085
- InChI: InChI=1S/C6H6N2O/c1-5(9)6-4-7-2-3-8-6/h2-4H,1H3 Key: DBZAKQWXICEWNW-UHFFFAOYSA-N; InChI=1/C6H6N2O/c1-5(9)6-4-7-2-3-8-6/h2-4H,1H3 Key: DBZAKQWXICEWNW-UHFFFAOYAU
- SMILES: CC(=O)C1=NC=CN=C1

Properties
Chemical formula	C_{6}H_{6}N_{2}O
Molar mass	122.127 g·mol^{−1}
Appearance	Yellow-brown powder
Melting point	75–78 °C (167–172 °F; 348–351 K)
Boiling point	78–79 °C (172–174 °F; 351–352 K) (8 mmHg)

Hazards
- Occupational safety and health (OHS/OSH)
Main hazards	Irritant
Safety data sheet (SDS)	External MSDS
- Except where otherwise noted, data are given for materials in their standard state (at 25 °C [77 °F], 100 kPa). Infobox references

Acetylpyrazine is an organic compound with the chemical formula C_{6}H_{6}N_{2}O. It is a yellow-brown powder at room temperature. Chemically, acetylpyrazine is a pyrazine and a ketone.

== Natural occurrence ==
Acetylpyrazine is found in foods such as seeds, nuts and meats.

== Uses ==
It is used in frozen dairy products such as ice cream.

It is considered generally recognized as safe by the U.S. Food and Drug Administration.

"Essence formula for increasing cigarette fragrance and improving smoke quality".

It is also known to be part of the formulation of e-cigarettes (vapes):

== Synthesis ==
Note that modern synthesis is for 2-cyanopyrazine from 2-methylpyrazine [109-08-0].

Patent ("Popcorn-like flavor and aroma"): Earlier patent:

Pyrazinamide [98-96-4] (1) 2-Cyanopyrazine [19847-12-2] (2)

More modern syntheses have also been reported in recent years:
