= Oct-1-en-3-one =

- Skeletal formula of oct-1-en-3-one

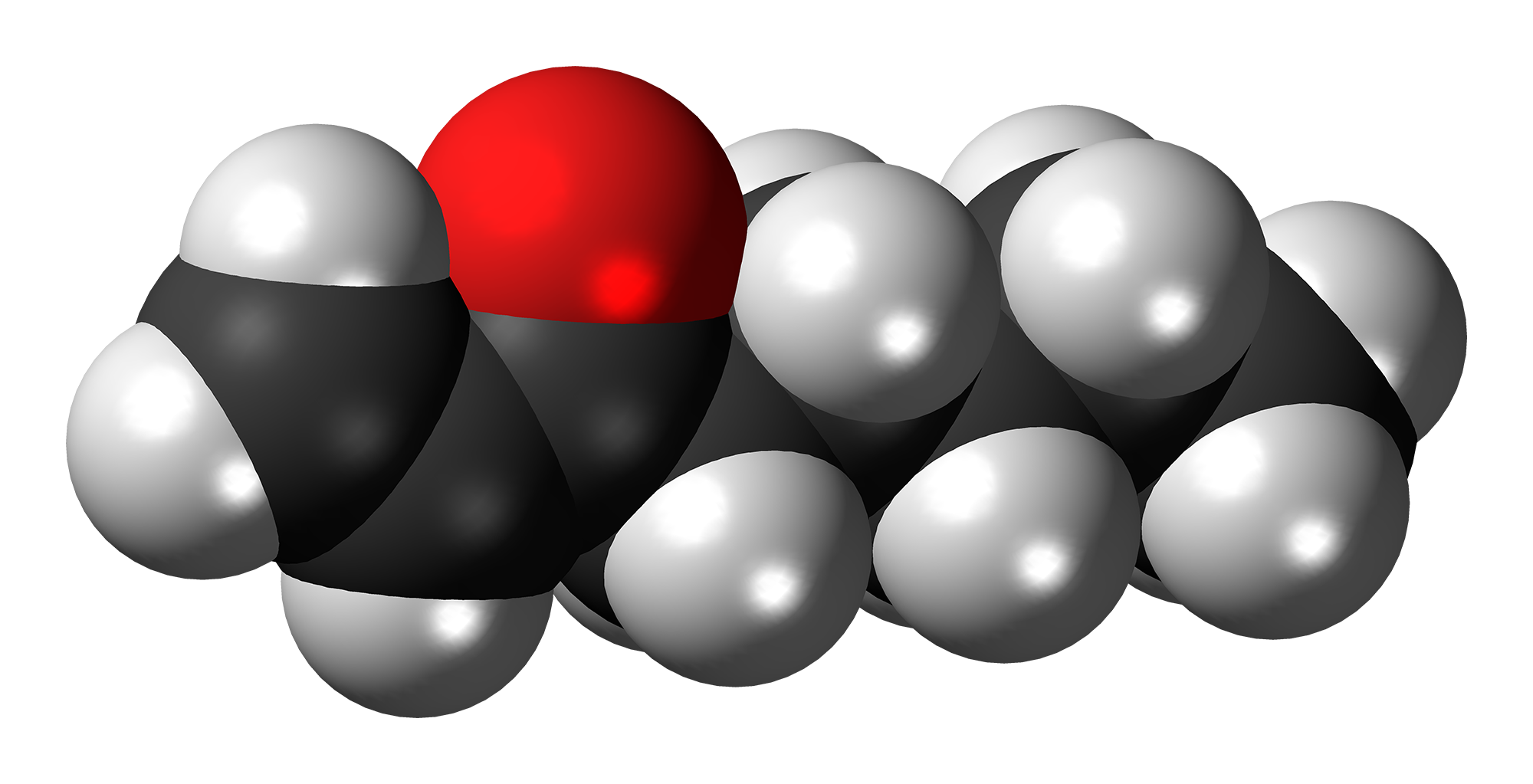

Names
- Preferred IUPAC name Oct-1-en-3-one

Identifiers
CAS Number	4312-99-6
3D model (JSmol)	Interactive image
ChemSpider	55282
ECHA InfoCard	100.022.116
PubChem CID	61346
UNII	7LT7Z4Q9XR
CompTox Dashboard (EPA)	DTXSID5047162
- InChI: InChI=1S/C8H14O/c1-3-5-6-7-8(9)4-2/h4H,2-3,5-7H2,1H3 Key: KLTVSWGXIAYTHO-UHFFFAOYSA-N; InChI=1/C8H14O/c1-3-5-6-7-8(9)4-2/h4H,2-3,5-7H2,1H3; InChI=1/C8H14O/c1-3-5-6-7-8(9)4-2/h4H,2-3,5-7H2,1H3 Key: KLTVSWGXIAYTHO-UHFFFAOYAV
- SMILES: O=C(C=C)CCCCC

Properties
Chemical formula	C_{8}H_{14}O
Molar mass	126.20 g/mol
Boiling point	56–60 °C (133–140 °F; 329–333 K) at 16 mm Hg

Hazards
- GHS labelling
Pictograms	(GHS02: Flammable) (GHS07: Exclamation mark)
NFPA 704 (fire diamond)	2 2 0
Flash point	35 °C (95 °F; 308 K)
Safety data sheet (SDS)	Fisher Scientific

Related compounds
Related enones	Methyl vinyl ketone
Related compounds	1-Octene
- Except where otherwise noted, data are given for materials in their standard state (at 25 °C [77 °F], 100 kPa). verify (what is ?) Infobox references

Oct-1-en-3-one (CH_{2}=CHC(=O)(CH_{2})_{4}CH_{3}), also known as 1-octen-3-one, octeneone or amyl vinyl ketone, is the odorant that is responsible for the typical "metallic" smell of metals (such as coins) and blood coming into contact with skin. Oct-1-en-3-one has a strong metallic mushroom-like odor with an odor detection threshold of 0.03–1.12 μg/m^{3} and it is the main compound responsible for the "smell of metal", followed by decanal (smell: orange skin, flowery) and nonanal (smell: tallowy, fruity).

Oct-1-en-3-one is the degradative reduction product of the chemical reaction of skin lipid peroxides and Fe^{2+}. Skin lipid peroxides are formed from skin lipid by oxidation, either enzymatically by lipoxygenases or by air oxygen. Oct-1-en-3-one is a ketone analog of the alkene 1-octene.

== Natural occurrences ==
It is produced by Uncinula necator, a fungus that causes powdery mildew of grape.

== See also ==
- Odorant
- 1-Octen-3-ol, the alcohol analog that is used by mosquitoes as an odor cue
