= Pyrazine =

Chemical compound

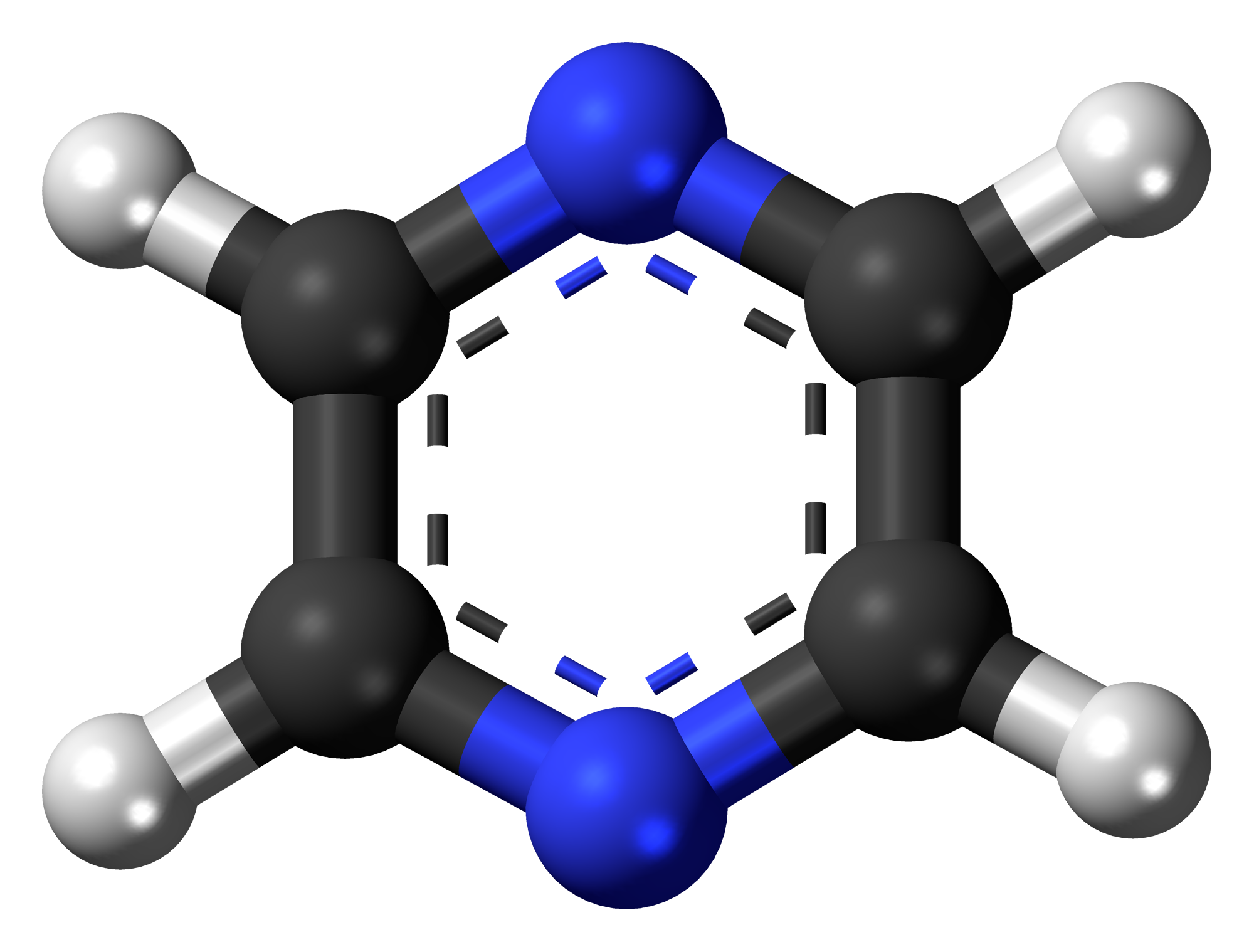

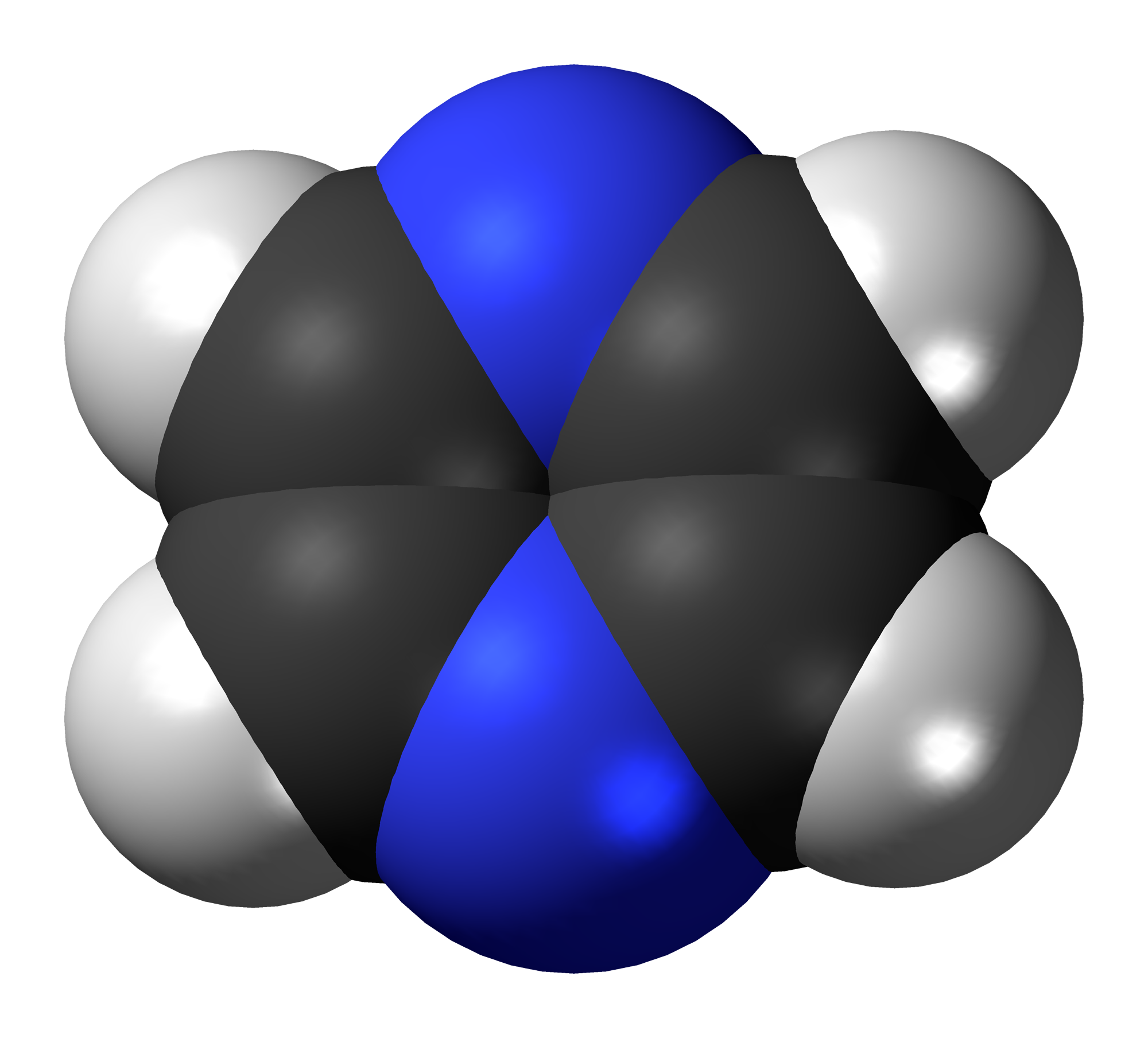

Names
- Preferred IUPAC name Pyrazine
- Other names 1,4-Diazabenzene, p-Diazine, 1,4-Diazine, Paradiazine, Piazine, UN 1325

Identifiers
CAS Number	290-37-9
3D model (JSmol)	Interactive image
ChEBI	CHEBI:30953
ChEMBL	ChEMBL15797
ChemSpider	8904
ECHA InfoCard	100.005.480
EC Number	206-027-6
PubChem CID	9261
UNII	2JKE371789
CompTox Dashboard (EPA)	DTXSID8049410
- InChI: InChI=1S/C4H4N2/c1-2-6-4-3-5-1/h1-4H Key: KYQCOXFCLRTKLS-UHFFFAOYSA-N; InChI=1/C4H4N2/c1-2-6-4-3-5-1/h1-4H
- SMILES: c1cnccn1

Properties
Chemical formula	C_{4}H_{4}N_{2}
Molar mass	80.090 g·mol^{−1}
Appearance	White crystals
Density	1.031 g/cm^{3}
Melting point	52 °C (126 °F; 325 K)
Boiling point	115 °C (239 °F; 388 K)
Solubility in water	Soluble
Acidity (pK_{a})	0.37 (protonated pyrazine)
Magnetic susceptibility (χ)	−37.6·10^{−6} cm^{3}/mol

Hazards
- GHS labelling
Pictograms	(GHS05: Corrosive) (GHS07: Exclamation mark)
Signal word	Danger
Hazard statements	H228, H315, H319, H335
Precautionary statements	P210, P261, P305+P351+P338
NFPA 704 (fire diamond)	2 2 0
Flash point	55 °C (131 °F; 328 K) c.c.
- Except where otherwise noted, data are given for materials in their standard state (at 25 °C [77 °F], 100 kPa). verify (what is ?) Infobox references

Pyrazine is a heterocyclic aromatic organic compound with the chemical formula C_{4}H_{4}N_{2}. It is a symmetrical molecule with point group D_{2h}. Pyrazine is less basic than pyridine, pyridazine and pyrimidine. It is a "deliquescent crystal or wax-like solid with a pungent, sweet, corn-like, nutty odour".

Pyrazine and a variety of alkylpyrazines are flavor and aroma compounds found in baked and roasted goods. Tetramethylpyrazine (also known as ligustrazine) is reported to scavenge superoxide anions and decrease nitric oxide production in human granulocytes.

== Synthesis ==
Many methods exist for the organic synthesis of pyrazine and its derivatives. Some of these are among the oldest synthesis reactions still in use.

In the Staedel–Rugheimer pyrazine synthesis (1876), 2-chloroacetophenone is reacted with ammonia to the amino ketone, then condensed and then oxidized to a pyrazine. A variation is the Gutknecht pyrazine synthesis (1879) also based on this selfcondensation, but differing in the way the alpha-ketoamine is synthesised.

The Gastaldi synthesis (1921) is another variation:

== See also ==
- Alkylpyrazines
- Methoxypyrazines
- Simple aromatic rings
- Benzene, an analog without the nitrogen atoms
- Pyridazine, an analog with the second nitrogen atom in position 2
- Pyridine, an analog with only one nitrogen atom
- Pyrimidine, an analog with the second nitrogen atom in position 3
- Piperazine, the saturated analog
