= Davana =

Scientific classification
- Domain: Eukaryota
- Kingdom: Animalia
- Phylum: Arthropoda
- Class: Insecta
- Order: Lepidoptera
- Family: Crambidae
- Genus: Davana; Walker, 1859
- Species: D. phalantalis

Binomial name
- Davana phalantalis Walker, 1859

Genus of moths

Davana is a genus of moths of the family Crambidae. It contains only one described species, Davana phalantalis. The identity of this species is unknown, since the type is lost.
