= 1-Octen-3-ol =

Names
- Preferred IUPAC name Oct-1-en-3-ol
- Other names Amyl vinyl carbinol; 1-Vinylhexanol; Matsutake alcohol; Vinyl amyl carbinol; Vinyl hexanol; Matsuica alcohol; Mushroom alcohol; 3-Hydroxy-1-octene; Octenol

Identifiers
CAS Number	3391-86-4; (R)-(−): 3687-48-7; (S)-(+): 24587-53-9
3D model (JSmol)	Interactive image; (R)-(−): Interactive image; (S)-(+): Interactive image
ChEBI	CHEBI:34118; (R)-(−): CHEBI:39932; (S)-(+): CHEBI:46735
ChEMBL	ChEMBL3183573; (R)-(−): ChEMBL1230177
ChemSpider	17778; (R)-(−): 5360388.html : 5360388; (S)-(+): 2007013.html : 2007013
DrugBank	(S)-(+): DB03025
ECHA InfoCard	100.020.206
EC Number	222-226-0
Gmelin Reference	648361
KEGG	C14272
PubChem CID	18827; (R)-(−): 6992244
UNII	WXB511GE38; (R)-(−): BYV0MEV7V1; (S)-(+): 07D31239FH
CompTox Dashboard (EPA)	DTXSID3035214
- InChI: InChI=1S/C8H16O/c1-3-5-6-7-8(9)4-2/h4,8-9H,2-3,5-7H2,1H3 Key: VSMOENVRRABVKN-UHFFFAOYSA-N; InChI=1/C8H16O/c1-3-5-6-7-8(9)4-2/h4,8-9H,2-3,5-7H2,1H3 Key: VSMOENVRRABVKN-UHFFFAOYAB; (R)-(−): Key: VSMOENVRRABVKN-QMMMGPOBSA-N; (S)-(+): Key: VSMOENVRRABVKN-MRVPVSSYSA-N
- SMILES: CCCCCC(C=C)O; (R)-(−): CCCCC[C@@H](O)C=C; (S)-(+): CCCCC[C@H](O)C=C

Properties
Chemical formula	C_{8}H_{16}O
Molar mass	128.215 g·mol^{−1}
Density	0.837 g/mL
Boiling point	174 ºC at 1 atm
Vapor pressure	0.3 kPa (at 50 °C)

Hazards
- GHS labelling
Pictograms	(GHS07: Exclamation mark)
Signal word	Warning
NFPA 704 (fire diamond)	2 2 0
Flash point	68 ºC
Autoignition temperature	245 ºC
Explosive limits	0.9% (low) to 8% (high)
- Lethal dose or concentration (LD, LC)
LD_{50} (median dose)	340 mg/kg (rat)
Safety data sheet (SDS)	Fisher Scientific
- Except where otherwise noted, data are given for materials in their standard state (at 25 °C [77 °F], 100 kPa). verify (what is ?) Infobox references

1-Octen-3-ol, octenol for short and also known as mushroom alcohol, is an organic compound with the formula CH_{2}=CHCH(OH)(CH_{2})_{4}CH_{3}. It is a chiral secondary alcohol. It is a colorless liquid that occurs widely in nature.

== Occurrence ==
The name "mushroom alcohol" for 1-octen-3-ol comes from its first isolation by S. Murahashi in 1936 and 1938 from crushed matsutake mushrooms. A recent study on volatiles of this mushroom has shown this compound is only produced upon tissue disruption. This alcohol is found in many other mushrooms where it may play a role as an antifeedant. In combination with exhaled CO_{2} and other volatile compounds secreted from the epidermis, it attracts biting insects such as mosquitoes. It is contained in human breath and sweat, and it is believed that the insect repellent DEET works by blocking the insects' octenol odorant receptors.

=== In nature ===
Octenol is produced by several plants and fungi, including edible mushrooms and lemon balm. Octenol is formed during oxidative breakdown of linoleic acid. Octenol is responsible for the moldy odor of damp indoor environments.

It is also a wine fault, defined as a cork taint, occurring in wines made with bunch rot contaminated grape.

== Synthesis ==
It can be prepared by the Grignard reaction of acrolein with the Grignard reagent derived from amyl iodide. It also arises by the selective reduction of 1-octen-3-one

=== Biosynthesis ===
1-Octen-3-ol is generated from the peroxidation of linoleic acid, catalyzed by a lipoxygenase, followed by cleavage of the resulting hydroperoxide with the help of a hydroperoxide lyase. This reaction takes place in cheese and is used in biotechnology to produce the (R)-isomer.

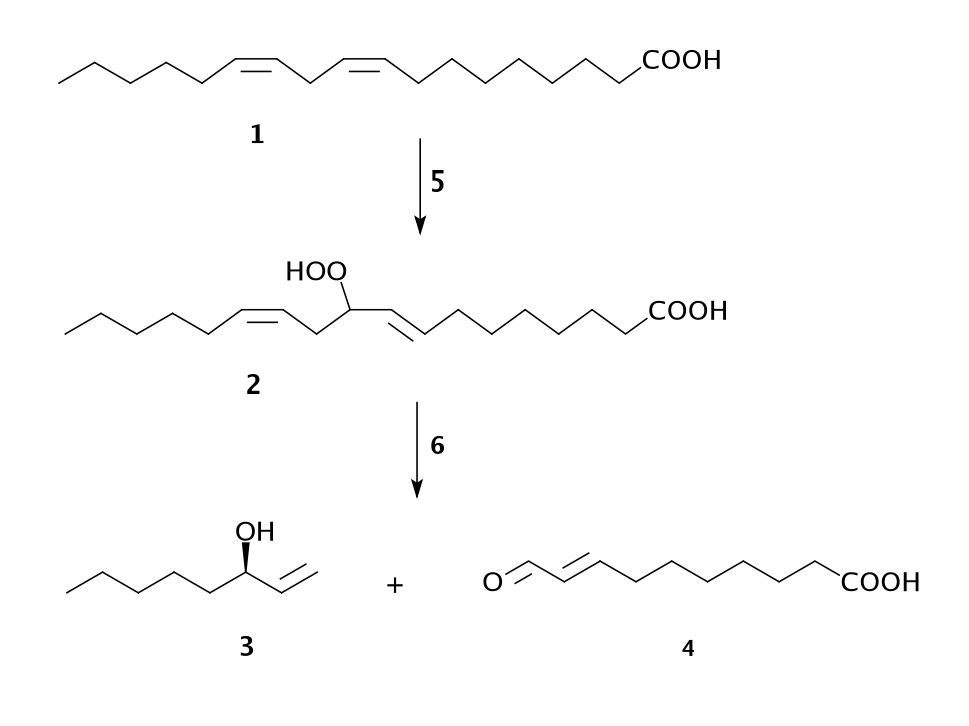
Biosynthesis of (R)-1-octen-3-ol: 1) linoleic acid, 2) (8E,12Z)-10-hydroperoxyoctadecadienoic acid, 3) (R)-1-octen-3-ol, 4) (8E)-10-oxodecenoic acid, 5) lipoxygenase, 6) hydroperoxide lyase.

== Uses ==
Octenol is used, sometimes in combination with carbon dioxide, to attract insects in order to kill them with certain electrical devices.

The enantiopure right-handed isomer known as mushroom alcohol or matsutake alcohol is used in perfumery, because it is the main flavor and odor component of matsutake.

== Health and safety ==
Octenol is approved by the U.S. Food and Drug Administration as a food additive. It is of moderate toxicity with an LD_{50} of 340 mg/kg.

In an animal study, octenol has been found to disrupt dopamine homeostasis and may be an environmental agent involved in parkinsonism.

== See also ==
- Olfactory receptor
- Oct-1-en-3-one, the ketone analog that gives blood on skin its typical metallic, mushroom-like smell
- 1-Octen-3-yl acetate, the acetate ester of this compound
