= Myristyl myristate =

Names
- IUPAC name Tetradecyl tetradecanoate
- Other names Tetradecyl myristate

Identifiers
CAS Number	3234-85-3
3D model (JSmol)	Interactive image
PubChem CID	18605
UNII	4042ZC00DY
- InChI: InChI=1S/C28H56O2/c1-3-5-7-9-11-13-15-17-19-21-23-25-27-30-28(29)26-24-22-20-18-16-14-12-10-8-6-4-2/h3-27H2,1-2H3 Key: DZKXJUASMGQEMA-UHFFFAOYSA-N
- SMILES: CCCCCCCCCCCCCCOC(=O)CCCCCCCCCCCCC

Properties
Chemical formula	C_{28}H_{56}O_{2}
Molar mass	424.754 g·mol^{−1}
Appearance	Way white solid
Melting point	40–44 °C (104–111 °F; 313–317 K)
Solubility in water	Insoluble
- Except where otherwise noted, data are given for materials in their standard state (at 25 °C [77 °F], 100 kPa). Infobox references

Myristyl myristate is the ester derived from myristyl alcohol and myristic acid.

== Properties ==
It has the molecular formula C_{28}H_{56}O_{2} and a molecular weight of 424.75 g/mol. Myristyl myristate appears as a white to yellowish waxy solid with a melting point just above body temperature (40–44 °C). Myristyl myristate is insoluble in water, but soluble in oils. It functions as a non-greasy emollient that melts near skin temperature, imparting a soft, slightly waxy feel.

== Uses ==
Myristyl myristate is primarily used in cosmetics and personal care products as an emollient, texture enhancer, and skin-conditioning agent. It improves the spreadability and stability of emulsions, adds body to creams and lotions, and provides a velvety skin feel.

== Safety ==
Acute oral and dermal toxicity tests in animals indicate that myristyl myristate is nontoxic. The Cosmetic Ingredient Review (CIR) Expert Panel has concluded that myristyl myristate is safe as a cosmetic ingredient in the present uses and concentrations.
