= Tetradecanal =

Names
- Preferred IUPAC name Tetradecanal
- Other names Myristaldehyde; Myristic aldehyde; n-Tetradecyl aldehyde

Identifiers
CAS Number	124-25-4
3D model (JSmol)	Interactive image
ChEBI	CHEBI:84067
ChemSpider	29031
ECHA InfoCard	100.004.267
PubChem CID	31291
UNII	44AJ2LT15N
CompTox Dashboard (EPA)	DTXSID1021665
- InChI: InChI=1S/C14H28O/c1-2-3-4-5-6-7-8-9-10-11-12-13-14-15/h14H,2-13H2,1H3 Key: UHUFTBALEZWWIH-UHFFFAOYSA-N; InChI=1/C14H28O/c1-2-3-4-5-6-7-8-9-10-11-12-13-14-15/h14H,2-13H2,1H3 Key: UHUFTBALEZWWIH-UHFFFAOYAK
- SMILES: CCCCCCCCCCCCCC=O

Properties
Chemical formula	C_{14}H_{28}O
Molar mass	212.377 g·mol^{−1}
Density	0.832 g/cm^{3} (15 °C)
Melting point	30 °C (86 °F; 303 K)
Boiling point	302 °C (576 °F; 575 K)
Solubility in water	0.0015 g/L

Hazards
- GHS labelling
Pictograms	(GHS07: Exclamation mark)
Signal word	Warning
Hazard statements	H315, H319
Precautionary statements	P264, P264+P265, P280, P302+P352, P305+P351+P338, P321, P332+P317, P337+P317, P362+P364
Flash point	113 °C (235 °F; 386 K)
- Except where otherwise noted, data are given for materials in their standard state (at 25 °C [77 °F], 100 kPa). Infobox references

Tetradecanal, also known as myristaldehyde, is a reduced form of myristic acid.

It is naturally produced by bioluminescent bacteria of the Vibrio genus and is one of two substrates produced and consumed by the Vibrio fischeri luciferase light emission system.
