= Isonicotinamide =

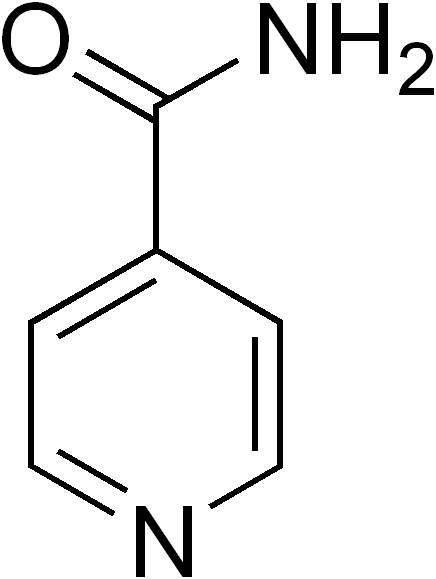

Names
- Preferred IUPAC name Pyridine-4-carboxamide

Identifiers
CAS Number	1453-82-3
3D model (JSmol)	Interactive image
ChEBI	CHEBI:6031
ChemSpider	14346
ECHA InfoCard	100.014.479
PubChem CID	15074
UNII	4H3BH6YX9Q
CompTox Dashboard (EPA)	DTXSID3020756
- InChI: InChI=1S/C6H6N2O/c7-6(9)5-1-3-8-4-2-5/h1-4H,(H2,7,9) Key: VFQXVTODMYMSMJ-UHFFFAOYSA-N; InChI=1/C6H6N2O/c7-6(9)5-1-3-8-4-2-5/h1-4H,(H2,7,9) Key: VFQXVTODMYMSMJ-UHFFFAOYAE
- SMILES: c1cnccc1C(=O)N

Properties
Chemical formula	C_{6}H_{6}N_{2}O
Molar mass	122.127 g·mol^{−1}
Melting point	155–157 °C
- Except where otherwise noted, data are given for materials in their standard state (at 25 °C [77 °F], 100 kPa). verify (what is ?) Infobox references

Isonicotinamide (pyridine-4-carboxamide) is the amide form of isonicotinic acid. It is an isomer of nicotinamide, which has the carboxamide group in the 3-position.

It is soluble in water (191 g/L), and is also soluble in ethanol, DMSO, methanol, chloroform, chloroform/methanol mixtures, and dioxane (10 mg/L). This compound is used for material synthesis.

Compounds in which the amide nitrogen is connected to another, and then doubly-bonded, are called isonicotinoylhydrazones.

== See also ==
- Nicotinamide
- Nicotinamide adenine dinucleotide
