= 6-Acetoxydihydrotheaspirane =

Names
- IUPAC name 2,6,10,10-Tetramethyl-1-oxaspiro[4.5]dec-6-yl acetate

Identifiers
| CAS Number | 57893-27-3 |
| 3D model (JSmol) | Interactive image |
| ChEBI | CHEBI:173800 |
| ChemSpider | 84699 |
| ECHA InfoCard | 100.055.442 |
| EC Number | 261-005-3 |
| PubChem CID | 93838 |
| UNII | 5V7Y54AAIG |
- InChI: InChI=1S/C15H26O3/c1-11-7-10-15(17-11)13(3,4)8-6-9-14(15,5)18-12(2)16/h11H,6-10H2,1-5H3 Key: LTAWGWRPOGXHBD-UHFFFAOYSA-N
- SMILES: CC1CCC2(O1)C(CCCC2(C)OC(=O)C)(C)C

Properties
| Chemical formula | C_{15}H_{26}O_{3} |
| Molar mass | 254.370 g·mol^{−1} |
| Appearance | crystalline or liquid |
| Melting point | 50 to 53 °C (122 to 127 °F; 323 to 326 K) |
| Solubility in water | insoluble |
| Solubility | soluble in fats |

Hazards
- Occupational safety and health (OHS/OSH)
| Main hazards | Harmful if swallowed, heated or ingested. |
| Safety data sheet (SDS) | clearsynth.com |
- Except where otherwise noted, data are given for materials in their standard state (at 25 °C [77 °F], 100 kPa). Infobox references

6-Acetoxydihydrotheaspirane is an organic compound. It is used as a flavoring agent in foods.

6-Acetoxydihydrotheaspirane is not found in nature. Its appearance is partly-liquid, partly-crystalline. It is not soluble in water, but is soluble in fats. It has been used in baked goods, instant coffee, condiments, relishes, and gravies. Tobacco companies use the chemical as well.
