= 3-Isobutyl-2-methoxypyrazine =

- 2d structure of 3-isobutyl-2-methoxypyrazine

Names
- Preferred IUPAC name 2-Methoxy-3-(2-methylpropyl)pyrazine
- Other names 2-Isobutyl-3-methoxypyrazine; IBMP Bell pepper ; galbazine; Galbanum pyrazine

Identifiers
CAS Number	24683-00-9
3D model (JSmol)	Interactive image
ChEBI	CHEBI:229442
ChEMBL	ChEMBL97355
ChemSpider	30208
DrugBank	DB04512
ECHA InfoCard	100.042.169
EC Number	246-402-1
PubChem CID	32594
UNII	S327O0T12O
CompTox Dashboard (EPA)	DTXSID9051907
- InChI: InChI=1S/C9H14N2O/c1-7(2)6-8-9(12-3)11-5-4-10-8/h4-5,7H,6H2,1-3H3 Key: UXFSPRAGHGMRSQ-UHFFFAOYSA-N
- SMILES: CC(C)CC1=NC=CN=C1OC

Properties
Chemical formula	C_{9}H_{14}N_{2}O
Molar mass	166.224 g·mol^{−1}
Appearance	Liquid

Hazards
- GHS labelling
Pictograms	(GHS07: Exclamation mark)
Signal word	Warning
Hazard statements	H315, H319, H335
Precautionary statements	P261, P264, P264+P265, P271, P280, P302+P352, P304+P340, P305+P351+P338, P319, P321, P332+P317, P337+P317, P362+P364, P403+P233, P405, P501
Flash point	80 °C (176 °F; 353 K)
- Except where otherwise noted, data are given for materials in their standard state (at 25 °C [77 °F], 100 kPa). Infobox references

3-Isobutyl-2-methoxypyrazine (2-isobutyl-3-methoxypyrazine also known as bell pepper odorant) is a methoxypyrazine that is very similar to isopropyl methoxy pyrazine except that the alkyl side-group contains an isobutyl group attached to the carbon alpha to the methoxy sidegroup instead of an isopropyl side-group at that same carbon position.

== Natural occurrence ==
The molecule is produced by some plants and is a contributor to the aroma of several plant-based foods. It is also seen to be produced in some forms of blue-green algae; however, it is most frequently found in members of the genus Capsicum. Specifically, it is what gives a bell pepper, along with other peppers, their distinctive smell. This is to such an extent that it is sometimes just called the "bell pepper pyrazine." The human nose can detect concentrations of this molecule below the part per trillion level making it one of the most odor intensive compounds on earth. Unlike capsaicin, which is produced and mainly stored in the placenta of the pepper, 3-isobutyl-2-methoxypyrazine is mainly contained in the flesh of the pepper. This is why dried pepper flakes and other spices derived from the seeds and placenta of peppers lack the aroma of what is thought of as a "fresh pepper smell".

== Uses ==
=== Illicit drug prevention ===
3-Isobutyl-2-methoxypyrazine has been noted, along with a few other food flavor additives, as a possible means of preventing the use of pseudoephedrine in the production of methamphetamine. A number of pharmaceutical companies have proposed various physical means of deterring such illicit uses namely by altering the method of drug delivery. However, these physical methods only make it more difficult to extract the pseudophedrine and do nothing to prevent the chemical transformation to methamphetamine. The addition of 3-isobutyl-2-methoxypyrazine to pseudophedrine effectively blocks the chemical production of methamphetamine from pseudophedrine while remaining biologically inert.

=== Fragrance and flavor ===
Since 3-isobutyl-2-methoxypyrazine has such a powerful scent, it is often used in fragrances and cleaners. It poses little threat to children or pets, making its use in detergents, candles, deodorants, gums and candies quite widespread. Even though it is not very volatile, it is often considered a top note in perfumery because the fragrance can be detected at such low levels. Chemically it behaves like a base note, since it has a low volatility; however, its pungency allows it to be identified with the other top notes in the fragrance even if its relative concentration in the air is much lower.

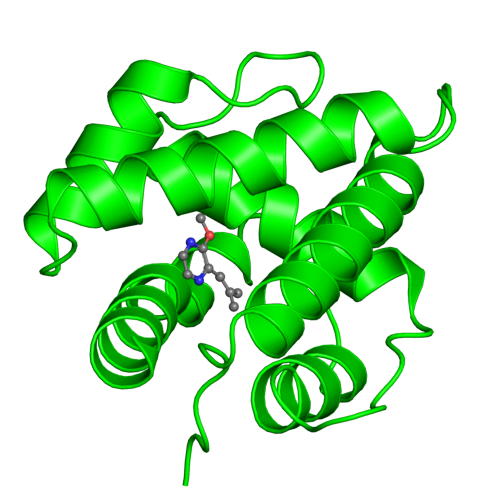
Bombyx mori pheromone binding protein bound to 3-isobutyl-2-methoxypyrazine (bell pepper odorant) PDB entry 2p70
