= 4-Vinylanisole =

Names
- Preferred IUPAC name 1-Ethenyl-4-methoxybenzene
- Other names p-vinylanisole, 4-methoxystyrene

Identifiers
CAS Number	637-69-4
3D model (JSmol)	Interactive image
ChemSpider	11991
ECHA InfoCard	100.010.272
EC Number	211-298-9
PubChem CID	12507
UNII	2ISH8T4A6E
CompTox Dashboard (EPA)	DTXSID7073222
- InChI: InChI=1S/C9H10O/c1-3-8-4-6-9(10-2)7-5-8/h3-7H,1H2,2H3 Key: UAJRSHJHFRVGMG-UHFFFAOYSA-N
- SMILES: COC1=CC=C(C=C1)C=C

Properties
Chemical formula	C_{9}H_{10}O
Molar mass	134.178 g·mol^{−1}
Appearance	colorless liquid
Density	1.001 g/cm^{3}
Melting point	2 °C (36 °F; 275 K)
Boiling point	205 °C (401 °F; 478 K)

Hazards
- GHS labelling
Pictograms	(GHS07: Exclamation mark)
Signal word	Warning
Hazard statements	H315, H319
Precautionary statements	P264, P280, P302+P352, P305+P351+P338, P321, P332+P313, P337+P313, P362
- Except where otherwise noted, data are given for materials in their standard state (at 25 °C [77 °F], 100 kPa). Infobox references

4-Vinylanisole is an organic compound with the formula CH_{3}OC_{6}H_{4}CH=CH_{2}. It is one of three isomers of vinylanisole. A colorless liquid, 4-vinylanisole is found in a number of foods and drinks. It is also a monomer for the synthesis of modified polystyrenes. It is an aggregation pheromone used by locusts.
