= Heptyl acetate =

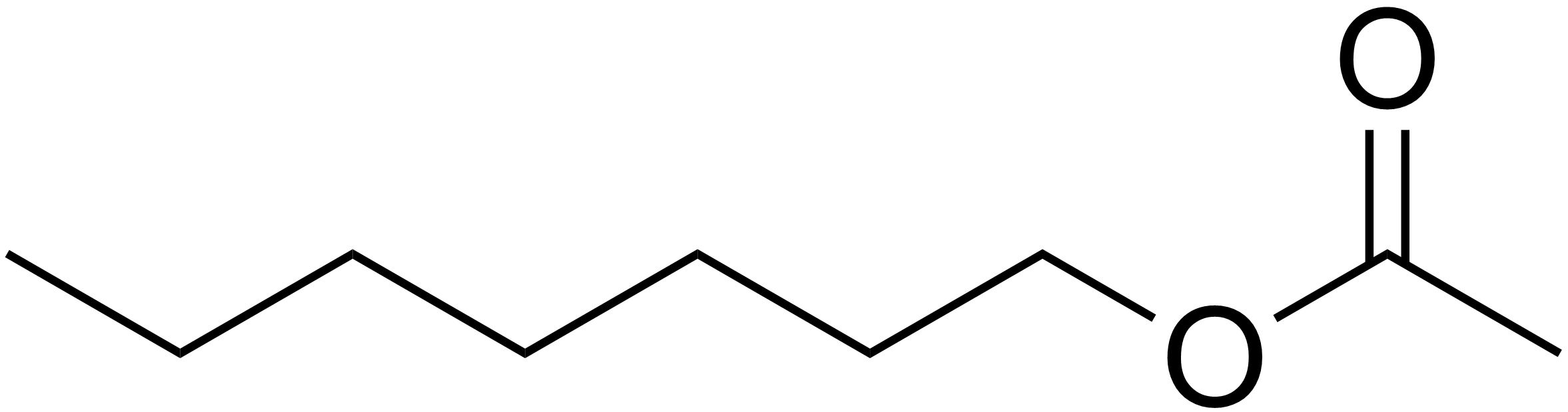

Names
- Preferred IUPAC name Heptyl acetate
- Other names n-Heptyl acetate Acetate C-7; Heptyl ethanoate

Identifiers
CAS Number	112-06-1
3D model (JSmol)	Interactive image
ChemSpider	7867
ECHA InfoCard	100.003.575
PubChem CID	8159
UNII	6551B78I5U
CompTox Dashboard (EPA)	DTXSID9047124
- InChI: InChI=1S/C9H18O2/c1-3-4-5-6-7-8-11-9(2)10/h3-8H2,1-2H3 Key: ZCZSIDMEHXZRLG-UHFFFAOYSA-N; InChI=1/C9H18O2/c1-3-4-5-6-7-8-11-9(2)10/h3-8H2,1-2H3 Key: ZCZSIDMEHXZRLG-UHFFFAOYAH
- SMILES: O=C(OCCCCCCC)C

Properties
Chemical formula	C_{9}H_{18}O_{2}
Molar mass	158.241 g·mol^{−1}
Density	0.862 - 0.872 g/cm^{3}
Melting point	−50 °C (−58 °F; 223 K)
Boiling point	192 to 193 °C (378 to 379 °F; 465 to 466 K)
- Except where otherwise noted, data are given for materials in their standard state (at 25 °C [77 °F], 100 kPa). verify (what is ?) Infobox references

Heptyl acetate (C_{9}H_{18}O_{2}), also known as acetate C-7, is a colorless alcohol-soluble liquid that is the ester formed by the condensation of 1-heptanol and acetic acid.

Heptyl acetate is used as a fruit essence flavoring in foods and as a scent in perfumes. It has a woody, fruity, rumlike odor and a spicy, floral taste with a soapy, fatty texture.
