= Acetophenone =

- Skeletal formula of the acetophenone molecule

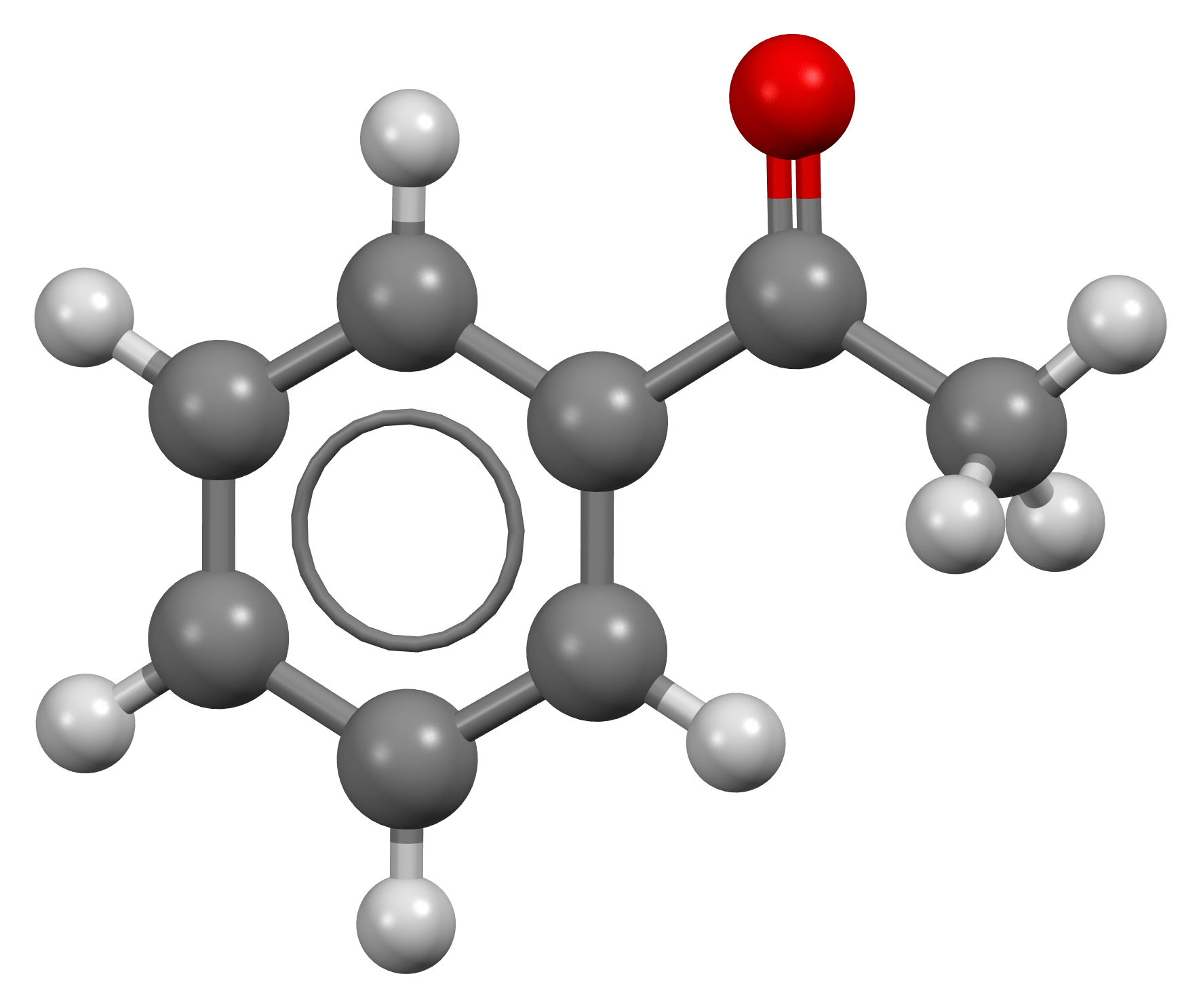
Ball-and-stick model of the acetophenone molecule
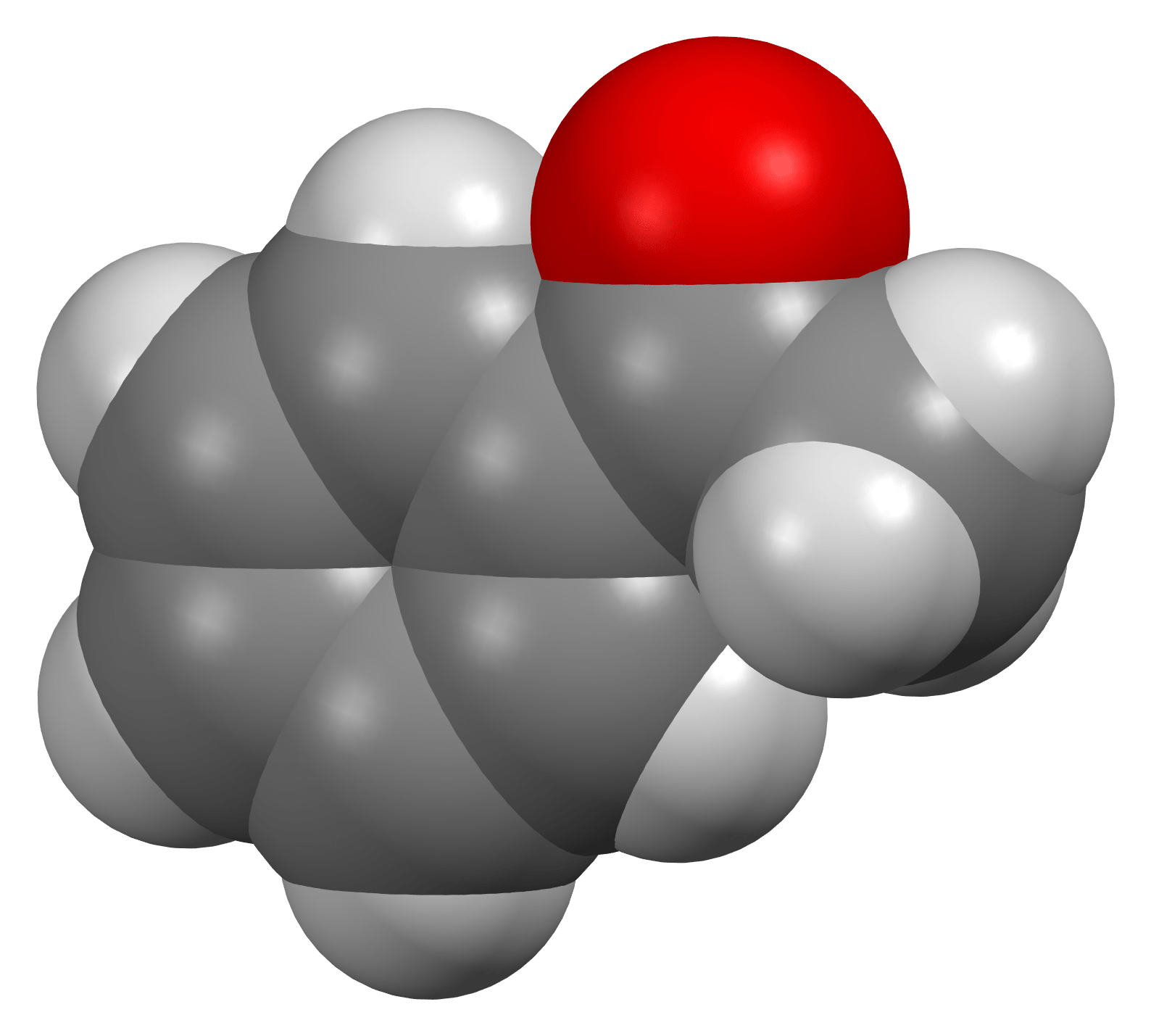
Space-filling model of the acetophenone molecule
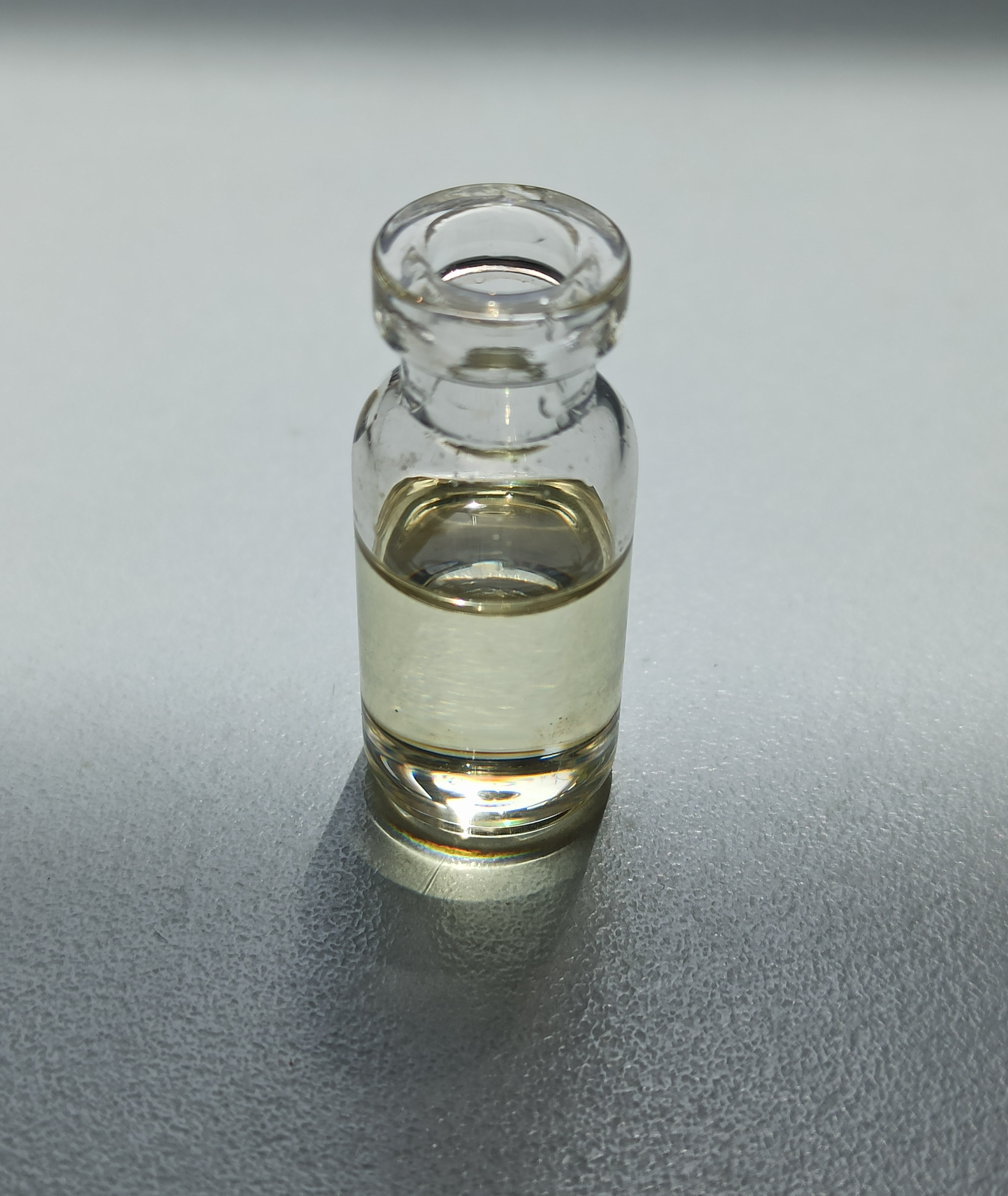
- sample of acetophenone

Names
- Preferred IUPAC name 1-Phenylethanone
- Other names Acetophenone; Phenylethanone; Methyl phenyl ketone

Identifiers
CAS Number	98-86-2
3D model (JSmol)	Interactive image; Interactive image
Abbreviations	ACP
ChEBI	CHEBI:27632
ChEMBL	ChEMBL274467
ChemSpider	7132
DrugBank	DB04619
ECHA InfoCard	100.002.462
EC Number	202-708-7
KEGG	C07113
PubChem CID	7410
RTECS number	AM5250000
UNII	RK493WHV10
UN number	1993
CompTox Dashboard (EPA)	DTXSID6021828
- InChI: InChI=1S/C8H8O/c1-7(9)8-5-3-2-4-6-8/h2-6H,1H3 Key: KWOLFJPFCHCOCG-UHFFFAOYSA-N; InChI=1/C8H8O/c1-7(9)8-5-3-2-4-6-8/h2-6H,1H3 Key: KWOLFJPFCHCOCG-UHFFFAOYAT
- SMILES: O=C(c1ccccc1)C; CC(=O)c1ccccc1

Properties
Chemical formula	C_{8}H_{8}O
Molar mass	120.151 g·mol^{−1}
Density	1.028 g/cm^{3}
Melting point	19–20 °C (66–68 °F; 292–293 K)
Boiling point	202 °C (396 °F; 475 K)
Solubility in water	5.5 g/L at 25 °C; 12.2 g/L at 80 °C
Magnetic susceptibility (χ)	−72.05·10^{−6} cm^{3}/mol

Hazards
- GHS labelling
Pictograms	(GHS07: Exclamation mark)
Signal word	Warning
Hazard statements	H302, H319
Precautionary statements	P264, P270, P280, P301+P312, P305+P351+P338, P330, P337+P313, P501
NFPA 704 (fire diamond)	1 2 0
Flash point	77 °C (171 °F; 350 K)
Safety data sheet (SDS)	MSDS
- Except where otherwise noted, data are given for materials in their standard state (at 25 °C [77 °F], 100 kPa). verify (what is ?) Infobox references

Acetophenone is the organic compound with the formula C_{6}H_{5}C(O)CH_{3}. It is the simplest aromatic ketone. This colorless, viscous liquid is a precursor to useful resins and fragrances.

== Production ==
Acetophenone is formed as a byproduct of the cumene process, the industrial route for the synthesis of phenol and acetone. In the Hock rearrangement of isopropylbenzene hydroperoxide, migration of a methyl group rather than the phenyl group gives acetophenone and methanol as a result of an alternate rearrangement of the intermediate:

C_{6}H_{5}C(CH_{3})_{2}O_{2}H → C_{6}H_{5}C(O)CH_{3} + CH_{3}OH

The cumene process is conducted on such a large scale that even the small amount of acetophenone by-product can be recovered in commercially useful quantities.

Acetophenone is also generated from ethylbenzene hydroperoxide. Ethylbenzene hydroperoxide is primarily converted to 1-phenylethanol (α-methylbenzyl alcohol) in the process with a small amount of by-product acetophenone. Acetophenone is recovered or hydrogenated to 1-phenylethanol which is then dehydrated to produce styrene.

== Uses ==
=== Precursor to resins ===
Commercially significant resins are produced from treatment of acetophenone with formaldehyde and a base. The resulting copolymers are conventionally described with the formula [(C_{6}H_{5}COCH)_{x}(CH_{2})_{x}]_{n}, resulting from aldol condensation. These substances are components of coatings and inks. Modified acetophenone-formaldehyde resins are produced by the hydrogenation of the aforementioned ketone-containing resins. The resulting polyol can be further crosslinked with diisocyanates. The modified resins are found in coatings, inks and adhesives.

=== Niche uses ===
Acetophenone is an ingredient in fragrances that resemble almond, cherry, honeysuckle, jasmine, and strawberry. It is used in chewing gum. It is also listed as an approved excipient by the U.S. FDA. More common as a fragrance is the closely related 4-methylacetophenone.

=== Laboratory reagent ===
In instructional laboratories, acetophenone is converted to styrene in a two-step process that illustrates the reduction of carbonyls using sodium borohydride and the dehydration of alcohols:

4 C_{6}H_{5}C(O)CH_{3} + NaBH_{4} + 4 H_{2}O → 4 C_{6}H_{5}CH(OH)CH_{3} + NaOH + B(OH)_{3}
C_{6}H_{5}CH(OH)CH_{3} → C_{6}H_{5}CH=CH_{2} + H_{2}O

A similar two-step process is used industrially, but reduction step is performed by hydrogenation over a copper chromite catalyst:

C_{6}H_{5}C(O)CH_{3} + H_{2} → C_{6}H_{5}CH(OH)CH_{3}

Being prochiral, acetophenone is also a popular test substrate for asymmetric hydrogenation experiments.

=== Drugs ===
Acetophenone is used for the synthesis of many pharmaceuticals.

== Natural occurrence ==
Acetophenone occurs naturally in many foods including apple, cheese, apricot, banana, beef, and cauliflower.

== Pharmacology ==
In the late 19th and early 20th centuries, acetophenone was used in medicine. It was marketed as a hypnotic and anticonvulsant under brand name Hypnone. The typical dosage was 0.12 to 0.3 milliliters. It was considered to have superior sedative effects to both paraldehyde and chloral hydrate. In humans, acetophenone is metabolized to benzoic acid, carbonic acid, and acetone. Hippuric acid occurs as an indirect metabolite and its quantity in urine may be used to confirm acetophenone exposure, although other substances, like toluene, also induce hippuric acid in urine.

== Toxicity ==
The LD_{50} is 815 mg/kg (oral, rats). Acetophenone is currently listed as a Group D carcinogen indicating that there is no evidence at present that it causes cancer in humans.
