= 1-Octen-3-yl acetate =

Names
- Preferred IUPAC name Oct-1-en-3-yl acetate
- Other names Amyl vinyl carbinyl acetate 3-Acetoxy-1-octene; 1-Pentylallyl acetate

Identifiers
CAS Number	2442-10-6
3D model (JSmol)	Interactive image
ChemSpider	16205
ECHA InfoCard	100.017.704
EC Number	219-474-7
PubChem CID	24901794
UNII	2PZ32LCA02
CompTox Dashboard (EPA)	DTXSID9051903
- InChI: InChI=1S/C10H18O2/c1-4-6-7-8-10(5-2)12-9(3)11/h5,10H,2,4,6-8H2,1,3H3 Key: DOJDQRFOTHOBEK-UHFFFAOYSA-N; InChI=1/C10H18O2/c1-4-6-7-8-10(5-2)12-9(3)11/h5,10H,2,4,6-8H2,1,3H3 Key: DOJDQRFOTHOBEK-UHFFFAOYAV
- SMILES: CC(=O)OC(C=C)CCCCC

Properties
Chemical formula	C_{10}H_{18}O_{2}
Molar mass	170.252 g·mol^{−1}
Density	0.878 g cm^{−3} at 25 °C
Boiling point	80 °C (176 °F; 353 K) at 20 hPa
Solubility in water	51.58 mg L^{−1} at 25 °C

Hazards
- GHS labelling
Hazard statements	H302, H317
Flash point	74 °C (165 °F; 347 K)
Safety data sheet (SDS)	MSDS
- Except where otherwise noted, data are given for materials in their standard state (at 25 °C [77 °F], 100 kPa). Infobox references

1-Octen-3-yl acetate is a chemical compound with molecular formula C_{10}H_{18}O_{2}. It is an ester of acetic acid and oct-1-en-3-ol. It exists as two enantiomers and can be obtained as a racemic mixture. It is a component of lavender oil.
