= Myristic acid =

14-Carbon fatty acid

- Skeletal formula of myristic acid

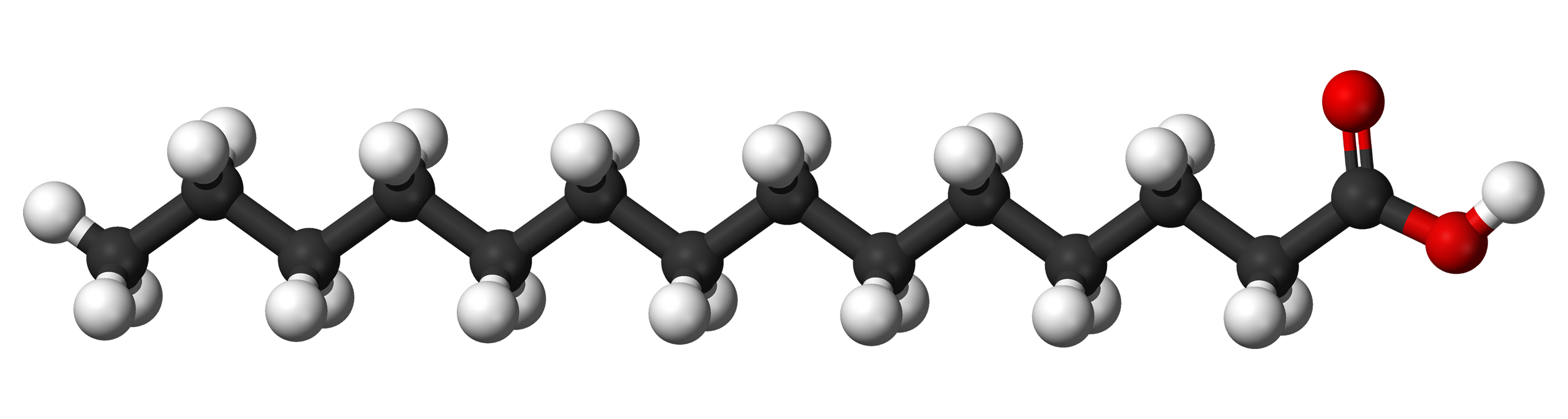
- Ball-and-stick model of myristic acid

Names
- Preferred IUPAC name Tetradecanoic acid
- Other names C14:0 (Lipid numbers)

Identifiers
CAS Number	544-63-8
3D model (JSmol)	Interactive image
ChEBI	CHEBI:28875
ChEMBL	ChEMBL111077
ChemSpider	10539
ECHA InfoCard	100.008.069
EC Number	208-875-2
IUPHAR/BPS	2806
PubChem CID	11005
RTECS number	QH4375000
UNII	0I3V7S25AW
CompTox Dashboard (EPA)	DTXSID6021666
- InChI: InChI=1S/C14H28O2/c1-2-3-4-5-6-7-8-9-10-11-12-13-14(15)16/h2-13H2,1H3,(H,15,16) Key: TUNFSRHWOTWDNC-UHFFFAOYSA-N; InChI=1/C14H28O2/c1-2-3-4-5-6-7-8-9-10-11-12-13-14(15)16/h2-13H2,1H3,(H,15,16) Key: TUNFSRHWOTWDNC-UHFFFAOYAZ
- SMILES: CCCCCCCCCCCCCC(=O)O

Properties
Chemical formula	C_{14}H_{28}O_{2}
Molar mass	228.376 g·mol^{−1}
Appearance	colorless or white solid
Density	1.03 g/cm^{3} (−3 °C); 0.99 g/cm^{3} (24 °C); 0.8622 g/cm^{3} (54 °C)
Melting point	54.4 °C (129.9 °F; 327.5 K)
Boiling point	326.2 °C (619.2 °F; 599.3 K) at 760 mmHg; 250 °C (482 °F; 523 K) at 100 mmHg; 218.3 °C (424.9 °F; 491.4 K) at 32 mmHg
Solubility in water	13 mg/L (0 °C); 20 mg/L (20 °C); 24 mg/L (30 °C); 33 mg/L (60 °C)
Solubility	Soluble in alcohol, acetates, C_{6}H_{6}, haloalkanes, phenyls, nitros
Solubility in acetone	2.75 g/100 g (0 °C); 15.9 g/100 g (20 °C); 42.5 g/100 g (30 °C); 149 g/100 g (40 °C)
Solubility in benzene	6.95 g/100 g (10 °C); 29.2 g/100 g (20 °C); 87.4 g/100 g (30 °C); 1.29 kg/100 g (50 °C)
Solubility in methanol	2.8 g/100 g (0 °C); 17.3 g/100 g (20 °C); 75 g/100 g (30 °C); 2.67 kg/100 g (50 °C)
Solubility in ethyl acetate	3.4 g/100 g (0 °C); 15.3 g/100 g (20 °C); 44.7 g/100 g (30 °C); 1.35 kg/100 g (40 °C)
Solubility in toluene	0.6 g/100 g (−10 °C); 3.2 g/100 g (0 °C); 30.4 g/100 g (20 °C); 1.35 kg/100 g (50 °C)
log P	6.1
Vapor pressure	0.01 kPa (118 °C); 0.27 kPa (160 °C); 1 kPa (186 °C)
Magnetic susceptibility (χ)	−176·10^{−6} cm^{3}/mol
Thermal conductivity	0.159 W/m·K (70 °C); 0.151 W/m·K (100 °C); 0.138 W/m·K (160 °C)
Refractive index (n_{D})	1.4723 (70 °C)
Viscosity	7.2161 cP (60 °C); 3.2173 cP (100 °C); 0.8525 cP (200 °C); 0.3164 cP (300 °C)

Structure
Crystal structure	Monoclinic (−3 °C)
Space group	P2_{1}/c
Lattice constant	a = 31.559 Å, b = 4.9652 Å, c = 9.426 Å α = 90°, β = 94.432°, γ = 90°

Thermochemistry
Heat capacity (C)	432.01 J/mol·K
Std enthalpy of formation (Δ_{f}H^{⦵}_{298})	−833.5 kJ/mol
Std enthalpy of combustion (Δ_{c}H^{⦵}_{298})	8675.9 kJ/mol

Hazards
- GHS labelling
Pictograms	(GHS07: Exclamation mark)
Signal word	Warning
Hazard statements	H315
NFPA 704 (fire diamond)	2 1 0
Flash point	> 110 °C (230 °F; 383 K)
- Lethal dose or concentration (LD, LC)
LD_{50} (median dose)	>10 g/kg (rats, oral)

Related compounds
Related esters of myristic acid	Isopropyl myristate Phorbol myristate acetate Myristylbenzylmorphine; Dimyristoylphosphatidylethanolamine
Related compounds	Tridecanoic acid, Pentadecanoic acid
- Except where otherwise noted, data are given for materials in their standard state (at 25 °C [77 °F], 100 kPa). verify (what is ?) Infobox references

Myristic acid (IUPAC name: tetradecanoic acid) is a common saturated fatty acid with the molecular formula CH_{3}(CH_{2})_{12}COOH. Its salts and esters are commonly referred to as myristates or tetradecanoates. The name of the acyl group derived from myristic acid is myristoyl or tetradecanoyl. The acid is named after the binomial name for nutmeg (Myristica fragrans), from which it was first isolated in 1841 by Lyon Playfair.

== Occurrence ==
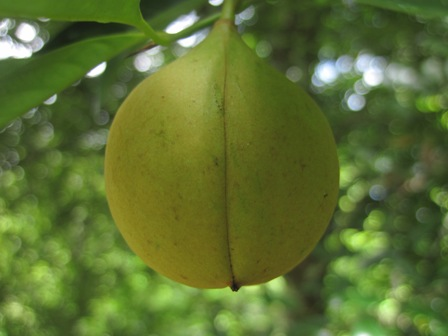
Myristica fragrans (nutmeg) fruit contains myristic acid

Nutmeg butter has 75% trimyristin, the triglyceride of myristic acid and a source from which it can be synthesised. Besides nutmeg, myristic acid is found in palm kernel oil, coconut oil, butterfat, 8–14% of bovine milk, and 8.6% of breast milk as well as being a minor component of many other animal fats. It is found in spermaceti, the crystallized fraction of oil from the sperm whale. It is also found in the rhizomes of the Iris, including Orris root.

== Chemical behaviour ==
Myristic acid acts as a lipid anchor in biomembranes.

Reduction of myristic acid yields myristyl aldehyde and myristyl alcohol.

== Health effects ==
Myristic acid consumption raises low-density lipoprotein (LDL) cholesterol.

== See also ==
- Saturated fat
- Myristyl myristate
- List of saturated fatty acids
