= Methoxypyrazine =

Class of chemical compounds

Chemical structure of 2-isopropyl-3-methoxypyrazin

Methoxypyrazines are a class of chemical compounds that produce odors. The odors tend to be undesirable, as in the case of certain wines, or as defensive chemicals used by insects such as Harmonia axyridis which produces isopropyl methoxy pyrazine (IPMP). They have also been identified as additives in cigarette manufacture. Detection thresholds are very low, typically near 2 parts per trillion (1 ng/L).

== Examples of methoxypyrazines in wine grapes ==
Cabernet Sauvignon has high levels of methoxypyrazines. Two methoxypyrazine compounds, 3-isobutyl-2-methoxypyrazine (IBMP) and 3-isopropyl-2-methoxypyrazine (IPMP), are considered to be important determinants of "green" (i.e., herbal, grassy, or vegetal) flavours in Sauvignon blanc wines.

== See also ==
- Alkylpyrazines
