= Sclareolide =

- Sclareolide

Names
- IUPAC name 3a,6,6,9a-tetramethyl-1,4,5,5a,7,8,9,9b-octahydronaphtho[8,7-d]furan-2-one
- Other names Norambreinolide

Identifiers
CAS Number	564-20-5
3D model (JSmol)	Interactive image
ChemSpider	809894
ECHA InfoCard	100.008.427
EC Number	209-269-0
PubChem CID	929262
UNII	37W4O0O6E6
CompTox Dashboard (EPA)	DTXSID8047686
- InChI: InChI=1S/C16H26O2/c1-14(2)7-5-8-15(3)11(14)6-9-16(4)12(15)10-13(17)18-16/h11-12H,5-10H2,1-4H3/t11-,12+,15-,16+/m0/s1 Key: IMKJGXCIJJXALX-SHUKQUCYSA-N; InChI=1/C16H26O2/c1-14(2)7-5-8-15(3)11(14)6-9-16(4)12(15)10-13(17)18-16/h11-12H,5-10H2,1-4H3/t11-,12+,15-,16+/m0/s1 Key: IMKJGXCIJJXALX-SHUKQUCYBO
- SMILES: C[C@]12CCCC([C@@H]1CC[C@@]3([C@@H]2CC(=O)O3)C)(C)C

Properties
Chemical formula	C_{16}H_{26}O_{2}
Molar mass	250.382 g·mol^{−1}
Density	0.55–0.65 g/cm^{3}
Melting point	123 °C (253 °F; 396 K)
- Except where otherwise noted, data are given for materials in their standard state (at 25 °C [77 °F], 100 kPa). verify (what is ?) Infobox references

Sclareolide is a sesquiterpene lactone natural product derived from various plant sources including Salvia sclarea, Salvia yosgadensis, and cigar tobacco. It is a close analog of sclareol, a plant antifungal compound.

It is used as a fragrance in cosmetics and has been more recently marketed as a weight loss supplement, though there is no clinical evidence to support this effect.
