= 4-Ethylbenzaldehyde =

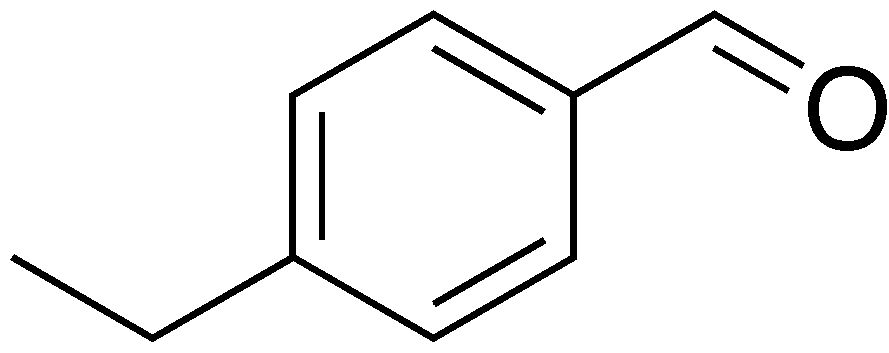

Names
- Preferred IUPAC name 4-Ethylbenzaldehyde
- Other names p-Ethylbenzaldehyde

Identifiers
| CAS Number | 4748-78-1 |
| 3D model (JSmol) | Interactive image |
| ChemSpider | 21105903 |
| ECHA InfoCard | 100.022.971 |
| PubChem CID | 20861 |
| UNII | 289PPW3SG4 |
| CompTox Dashboard (EPA) | DTXSID0047080 |
- InChI: InChI=1S/C9H10O/c1-2-8-3-5-9(7-10)6-4-8/h3-7H,2H2,1H3 Key: QNGNSVIICDLXHT-UHFFFAOYSA-N; InChI=1/C9H10O/c1-2-8-3-5-9(7-10)6-4-8/h3-7H,2H2,1H3 Key: QNGNSVIICDLXHT-UHFFFAOYAN
- SMILES: CCc1ccc(C=O)cc1

Properties
| Chemical formula | C_{9}H_{10}O |
| Molar mass | 134.178 g·mol^{−1} |
| Appearance | clear colourless to slightly yellow liquid |
| Density | 1.001 g/mL |
| Boiling point | 221.7 °C (431.1 °F; 494.8 K) |
- Except where otherwise noted, data are given for materials in their standard state (at 25 °C [77 °F], 100 kPa). verify (what is ?) Infobox references

4-Ethylbenzaldehye is a derivative of benzaldehyde. It is a food additive that has a bitter almond flavor, and is pale or colorless. It can be synthesized by the Sommelet reaction.
