= Tetramethylpyrazine =

Names
- Preferred IUPAC name Tetramethylpyrazine
- Other names Ligustrazine; Tetrapyrazine

Identifiers
CAS Number	1124-11-4
3D model (JSmol)	Interactive image
ChEBI	CHEBI:133246
ChemSpider	13658
ECHA InfoCard	100.013.084
EC Number	214-391-2
PubChem CID	14296
UNII	V80F4IA5XG
CompTox Dashboard (EPA)	DTXSID6047070
- InChI: InChI=1S/C8H12N2/c1-5-6(2)10-8(4)7(3)9-5/h1-4H3 Key: FINHMKGKINIASC-UHFFFAOYSA-N; InChI=1S/C8H12N2/c1-5-6(2)10-8(4)7(3)9-5/h1-4H3 Key: FINHMKGKINIASC-UHFFFAOYSA-N
- SMILES: CC1=C(N=C(C(=N1)C)C)C

Properties
Chemical formula	C_{8}H_{12}N_{2}
Molar mass	136.198 g·mol^{−1}
Appearance	colorless solid
Melting point	84–86 °C (183–187 °F; 357–359 K)
- Except where otherwise noted, data are given for materials in their standard state (at 25 °C [77 °F], 100 kPa). Infobox references

Tetramethylpyrazine, also known as ligustrazine, is a chemical compound found in nattō and in fermented cocoa beans. In an observational study, tetramethylpyrazine was the dominant volatile organic compound in one sourdough starter. When purified, tetramethylpyrazine is a colorless solid. It is classified as an alkylpyrazine. The biosynthesis pathway in bacteria starts with acetoin, which is derived from pyruvic acid. It exhibits potential nootropic and antiinflammatory activities in rats.
