= Solanone =

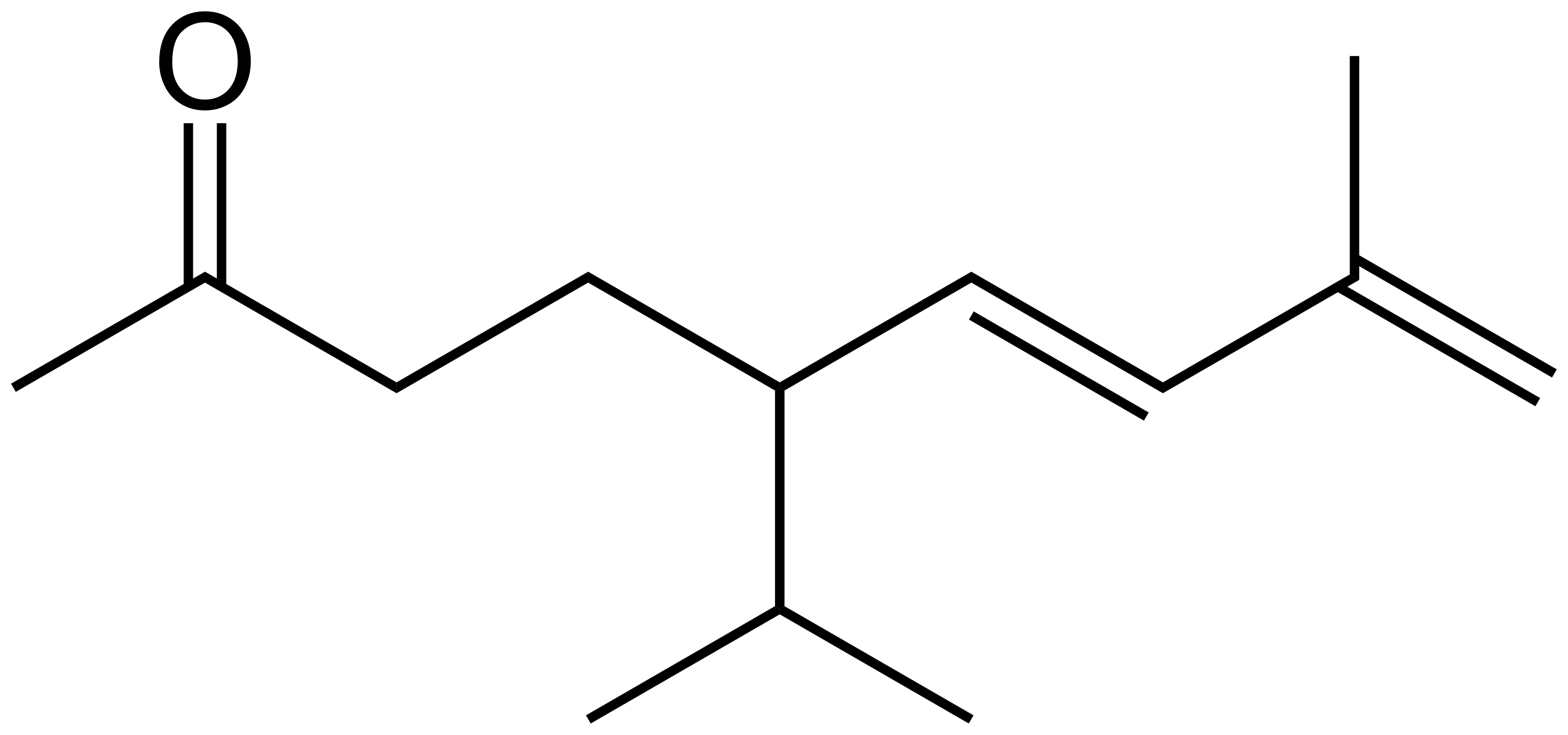

Names
- Preferred IUPAC name (6E)-8-Methyl-5-(propan-2-yl)nona-6,8-dien-2-one

Identifiers
CAS Number	1937-54-8
3D model (JSmol)	Interactive image
ChemSpider	4953808
PubChem CID	6451337
UNII	233MY0C8V7
- InChI: InChI=1S/C13H22O/c1-10(2)6-8-13(11(3)4)9-7-12(5)14/h6,8,11,13H,1,7,9H2,2-5H3/b8-6+/t13-/m0/s1 Key: PQDRXUSSKFWCFA-CFNZNRNTSA-N; InChI=1/C13H22O/c1-10(2)6-8-13(11(3)4)9-7-12(5)14/h6,8,11,13H,1,7,9H2,2-5H3/b8-6+/t13-/m0/s1 Key: PQDRXUSSKFWCFA-CFNZNRNTBT
- SMILES: O=C(C)CC[C@H](/C=C/C(=C)C)C(C)C

Properties
Chemical formula	C_{13}H_{22}O
Molar mass	194.31 g/mol
- Except where otherwise noted, data are given for materials in their standard state (at 25 °C [77 °F], 100 kPa). verify (what is ?) Infobox references

Solanone is an unsaturated ketone, an organic chemical used as a fragrance.

It was discovered in 1967 by Johnson and Nicholson, American tobacconists. It is naturally present in tobacco leaves. As the extraction of natural product is expensive, it is currently being mostly manufactured synthetically. It is also found in blackcurrant buds.

Solanone is used as a cigarette additive. It enhances the fragrance of tobacco, improving the sensoric qualities of cigarettes. It can also compensate the loss of flavor associated with procedures lowering tar content.
