= 4-Methylacetophenone =

Names
- IUPAC name 1-(4-methylphenyl)ethanone
- Other names p-Methylacetophenone; p-Acetyltoluene

Identifiers
CAS Number	122-00-9
3D model (JSmol)	Interactive image
ChEBI	CHEBI:178626
ChEMBL	ChEMBL271871
ChemSpider	8186
ECHA InfoCard	100.004.105
EC Number	204-514-8
PubChem CID	8500
UNII	AX66V0KX3Y
CompTox Dashboard (EPA)	DTXSID9044374
- InChI: InChI=1S/C9H10O/c1-7-3-5-9(6-4-7)8(2)10/h3-6H,1-2H3 Key: GNKZMNRKLCTJAY-UHFFFAOYSA-N
- SMILES: CC1=CC=C(C=C1)C(=O)C

Properties
Chemical formula	C_{9}H_{10}O
Molar mass	134.178 g·mol^{−1}
Appearance	white or colorless oil
Density	1.006 g/cm^{3}
Melting point	28 °C (82 °F; 301 K)
Boiling point	224 °C (435 °F; 497 K)

Hazards
- GHS labelling
Pictograms	(GHS07: Exclamation mark)
Signal word	Warning
Hazard statements	H302, H315
Precautionary statements	P264, P270, P280, P301+P317, P302+P352, P321, P330, P332+P317, P362+P364, P501
- Except where otherwise noted, data are given for materials in their standard state (at 25 °C [77 °F], 100 kPa). Infobox references

4-Methylacetophenone is an organic compound with the formula CH_{3}C_{6}H_{4}C(O)CH_{3}. It is related to acetophenone with a methyl group at the 4-position. Two isomers, 2-methylacetophenone and 3-methylacetophenone, are also known. It is a fragrance of commercial significance.

== Synthesis and reactions ==
It is prepared by acetylation of toluene.

Oxidation with hot nitric acid followed by potassium permanganate gives terephthalic acid. It undergoes most of the reactions of acetophenone: reduction to the alcohol followed by dehydration gives 4-methylstyrene.

== Occurrence ==
4-Methylacetophenone occurs naturally in some woods.
