= Alkylpyrazine =

Chemical compounds

Alkylpyrazines are chemical compounds based on pyrazine with different substitution patterns. Some alkylpyrazines are naturally occurring highly aromatic substances which often have a very low odor threshold and contribute to the taste and aroma of various foods including chocolate, baked goods, coffee, and wines. Alkylpyrazines are also formed during the cooking of some foods via Maillard reactions.

== Examples ==
2-Methylpyrazine (found in roasted sesame)

2,3-Dimethylpyrazine (found in roasted sesame)

2,5-Dimethylpyrazine (asparagus, tea, crispbread, malt, shrimp, soy, squid, Swiss cheese, bread, roasted sesame)

2,3,5,6-Tetramethylpyrazine (nattō, fermented cocoa beans)

=== 2-Methylpyrazine ===
2-Methylpyrazine was the volatile odorant found at the highest concentration in roasted sesame seed oil.

=== 2,3-Dimethylpyrazine ===
2,3-Dimethylpyrazine is a component of the aroma of roasted sesame seeds.

=== 2,5-Dimethylpyrazine ===
2,5-Dimethylpyrazine is used as flavor additive and odorant in foods such as cereals and products such as cigarettes. It occurs naturally in asparagus, black or green tea, crispbread, malt, raw shrimp, Soybean, squid, Swiss cheeses, and wheat bread. It's also found in roasted sesame. The chemical formula is C_{6}H_{8}N_{2}.

=== 2,6-Dimethylpyrazine ===
2,6-Dimethylpyrazine is also used as flavor additive and odorant in foods such as cereals and products such as cigarettes. It occurs naturally in baked potato, black or green tea, crispbread, French fries, malt, peated malt, raw asparagus, roasted barley, roasted filberts or pecans, squid, wheat bread, wild rice (Zizania aquatica), and wort. It's also found in roasted sesame. The chemical formula is C_{6}H_{8}N_{2}.

=== 2,3,5,6-Tetramethylpyrazine ===
Tetramethylpyrazine (ligustrazine) is found in nattō and in fermented cocoa beans.

== See also ==
- Methoxypyrazines
