= C8H16O =

The molecular formula C_{8}H_{16}O may refer to:

- 2-Ethylhexanal
- 4-Methylcyclohexanemethanol
- Octanal
- Octanones
  - 2-Octanone
  - 3-Octanone
  - 4-Octanone
- 1-Octen-3-ol
- Tetramethyltetrahydrofurans
  - 2,2,5,5-Tetramethyltetrahydrofuran
  - 3,3,4,4-Tetramethyltetrahydrofuran
