= C8H12O3 =

The molecular formula C_{8}H_{12}O_{3} (molar mass: 156.18 g/mol) may refer to:

- 3,4-Epoxycyclohexanecarboxylate methyl ester
- 3,3,4,4-Tetramethyltetrahydrofuran-2,5-dione
