= Crotonaldehyde =

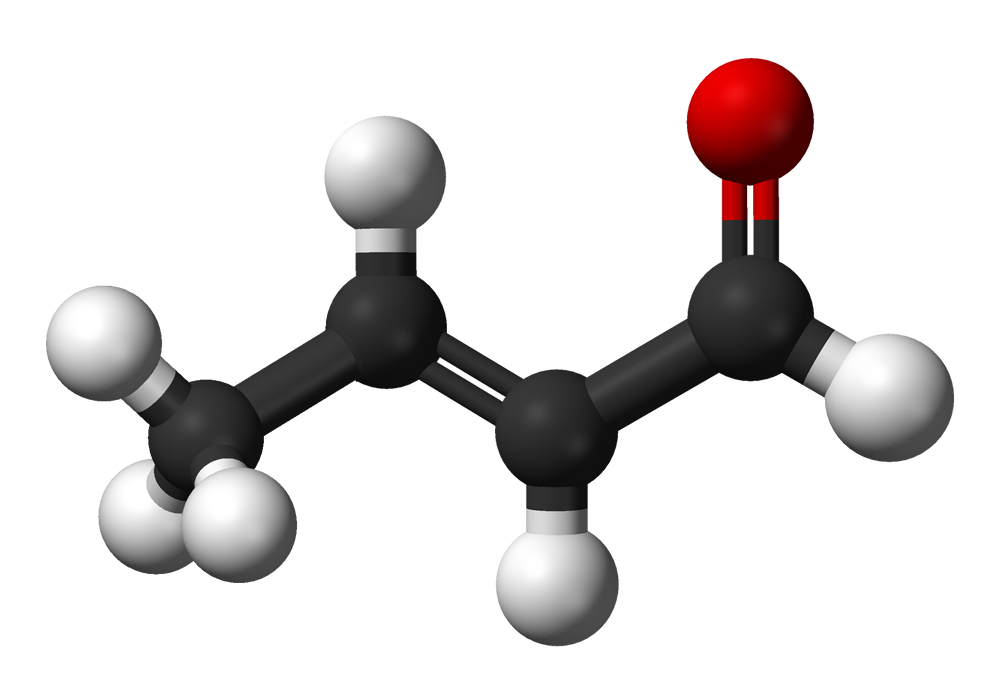

Names
- IUPAC name (2E)-but-2-enal
- Other names Crotonaldehyde; Crotonic aldehyde β-Methacrolein β-Methyl acrolein 2-butenal Propylene aldehyde

Identifiers
CAS Number	4170-30-3 (E/Z); 123-73-9 (E); 15798-64-8 (Z)
3D model (JSmol)	Interactive image
ChEBI	CHEBI:41607
ChEMBL	ChEMBL1086445
ChemSpider	394562
DrugBank	DB04381
ECHA InfoCard	100.021.846
EC Number	204-647-1
IUPHAR/BPS	6288
KEGG	C19377
PubChem CID	447466
RTECS number	GP9499000
UNII	9G72074TUW (E/Z); 6PUW625907 (E); RB9WCA91QT (Z)
UN number	1143
CompTox Dashboard (EPA)	DTXSID8024864
- InChI: InChI=1S/C4H6O/c1-2-3-4-5/h2-4H,1H3/b3-2+ Key: MLUCVPSAIODCQM-NSCUHMNNSA-N; InChI=1/C4H6O/c1-2-3-4-5/h2-4H,1H3/b3-2+ Key: MLUCVPSAIODCQM-NSCUHMNNBQ
- SMILES: O=C/C=C/C

Properties ((E) isomer)
Chemical formula	C_{4}H_{6}O
Molar mass	70.091 g·mol^{−1}
Appearance	colourless liquid
Odor	pungent, suffocating odor
Density	0.846 g/cm^{3}
Melting point	−76.5 °C (−105.7 °F; 196.7 K)
Boiling point	104.0 °C (219.2 °F; 377.1 K)
Solubility in water	18% (20 °C)
Solubility	very soluble in ethanol, ethyl ether, acetone soluble in chloroform miscible in benzene
Vapor pressure	19 mmHg (20 °C)
Refractive index (n_{D})	1.4362

Hazards
- GHS labelling
Pictograms	(GHS02: Flammable) (GHS05: Corrosive) (GHS06: Toxic) (GHS07: Exclamation mark) (GHS08: Health hazard) (GHS09: Environmental hazard)
Signal word	Danger
Hazard statements	H225, H301, H310, H311, H315, H318, H330, H335, H341, H373, H400
Precautionary statements	P201, P202, P210, P233, P240, P241, P242, P243, P260, P262, P264, P270, P271, P273, P280, P281, P284, P301+P310, P302+P350, P302+P352, P303+P361+P353, P304+P340, P305+P351+P338, P308+P313, P310, P312, P314, P320, P321, P330, P332+P313, P361, P362, P363, P370+P378, P391, P403+P233, P403+P235, P405, P501
NFPA 704 (fire diamond)	4 3 2
Flash point	13 °C (55 °F; 286 K)
Autoignition temperature	207 °C (405 °F; 480 K)
Explosive limits	2.1–15.5%
- Lethal dose or concentration (LD, LC)
LC_{50} (median concentration)	600 ppm (rat, 30 min); 1375 ppm (rat, 30 min); 519 ppm (mouse, 2 hr); 1500 ppm (rat, 30 min)
LC_{Lo} (lowest published)	400 ppm (rat, 1 hr)
- NIOSH (US health exposure limits)
PEL (Permissible)	TWA 2 ppm (6 mg/m^{3})
REL (Recommended)	TWA 2 ppm (6 mg/m^{3})
IDLH (Immediate danger)	50 ppm

Related compounds
Related alkenals	Acrolein cis-3-hexenal (E,E)-2,4-Decadienal
- Except where otherwise noted, data are given for materials in their standard state (at 25 °C [77 °F], 100 kPa). verify (what is ?) Infobox references

Crotonaldehyde is a chemical compound with the formula CH_{3}CH=CHCHO. The compound is usually sold as a mixture of the E- and Z-isomers, which differ with respect to the relative position of the methyl and formyl groups. The E-isomer is more common. This lachrymatory liquid is moderately soluble in water and miscible in organic solvents. As an unsaturated aldehyde, crotonaldehyde is a versatile intermediate in organic synthesis. It occurs in a variety of foodstuffs, e.g. soybean oils.

== Production and reactivity ==
Crotonaldehyde is produced by the aldol condensation of acetaldehyde:

2 CH_{3}CHO → CH_{3}CH=CHCHO + H_{2}O

Crotonaldehyde is a multifunctional molecule that exhibits diverse reactivity. It is a prochiral dienophile. It is a Michael acceptor. Addition of methylmagnesium chloride produces 3-penten-2-ol.

== Uses ==
Crotonylidene diurea is a specialty fertilizer.

It is a precursor to many fine chemicals. A prominent industrial example is the crossed aldol condensation with diethyl ketone to give trimethylcyclohexenone, this can be easily converted to trimethylhydroquinone, which is a precursor to the vitamin E. Other derivatives include crotonic acid, 3-methoxybutanol and the food preservative Sorbic acid. Condensation with two equivalents of urea gives a pyrimidine derivative that is employed as a controlled-release fertilizer.

Trans-crotonaldehyde is commonly used to determine the effective Lewis acidity of Lewis acids, determined from the change in ^{1}H NMR shift of the crotonaldehyde handle on binding to a Lewis acid. Limitations of the method include secondary interactions to the ^{1}H NMR handle obscuring the true effect of the Lewis acid, and weak donor strengths of trans-crotonaldehyde resulting in incomplete Lewis acid-base adduct formation.

Crotonaldehyde has application in the following list of agents: Griseofulvin, Crotoniazide, Tilidine, Sethoxydim, Nicocortonide, Kethoxal & 2-Ethylidene-cis-3-hexenal.

== Safety ==
Crotonaldehyde is a potent irritant even at the ppm levels. It is not very toxic, with an LD_{50} of 174 mg/kg (rats, oral).

== See also ==
- Crotyl
- Crotonic acid
- Crotyl alcohol
- Methacrolein
