= Smell of freshly cut grass =

Odour released when grass is damaged

The smell of freshly cut grass is an odour caused by green leaf volatiles (GLVs) released when it is damaged. Mechanical damage to grass from activities such as lawnmowing results in the release of cis-3-hexenal and other compounds that contribute to a grassy or "green" smell. cis-3-Hexenal has a low odour detection threshold that humans can perceive at concentrations as low as 0.25 parts per billion.

The GLVs responsible for the smell of freshly cut grass play a role in plant communication and plant defence against herbivory, functioning as a distress signal warning other plants of imminent danger and, in some instances, as a way to attract predators of grass-eating insects. For humans, the smell of freshly cut grass is connected through olfactory memory to past experiences involving the odour and may evoke nostalgia, eliciting associations with spring or summer.

== Chemical composition ==
When grass is cut or damaged, lipoxygenase enzymes begin a breakdown of membranes in the plant's cells, producing linoleic and linolenic acids. Exposure to oxygen leads to the formation of cis-3-hexenal, which rapidly breaks down to cis-3-hexenol (leaf alcohol) and trans-2-hexenal (leaf aldehyde). These green leaf volatiles (GLVs) are a combination of alcohols, aldehydes, and esters. The oxygenated hydrocarbons cause a "green" odour.

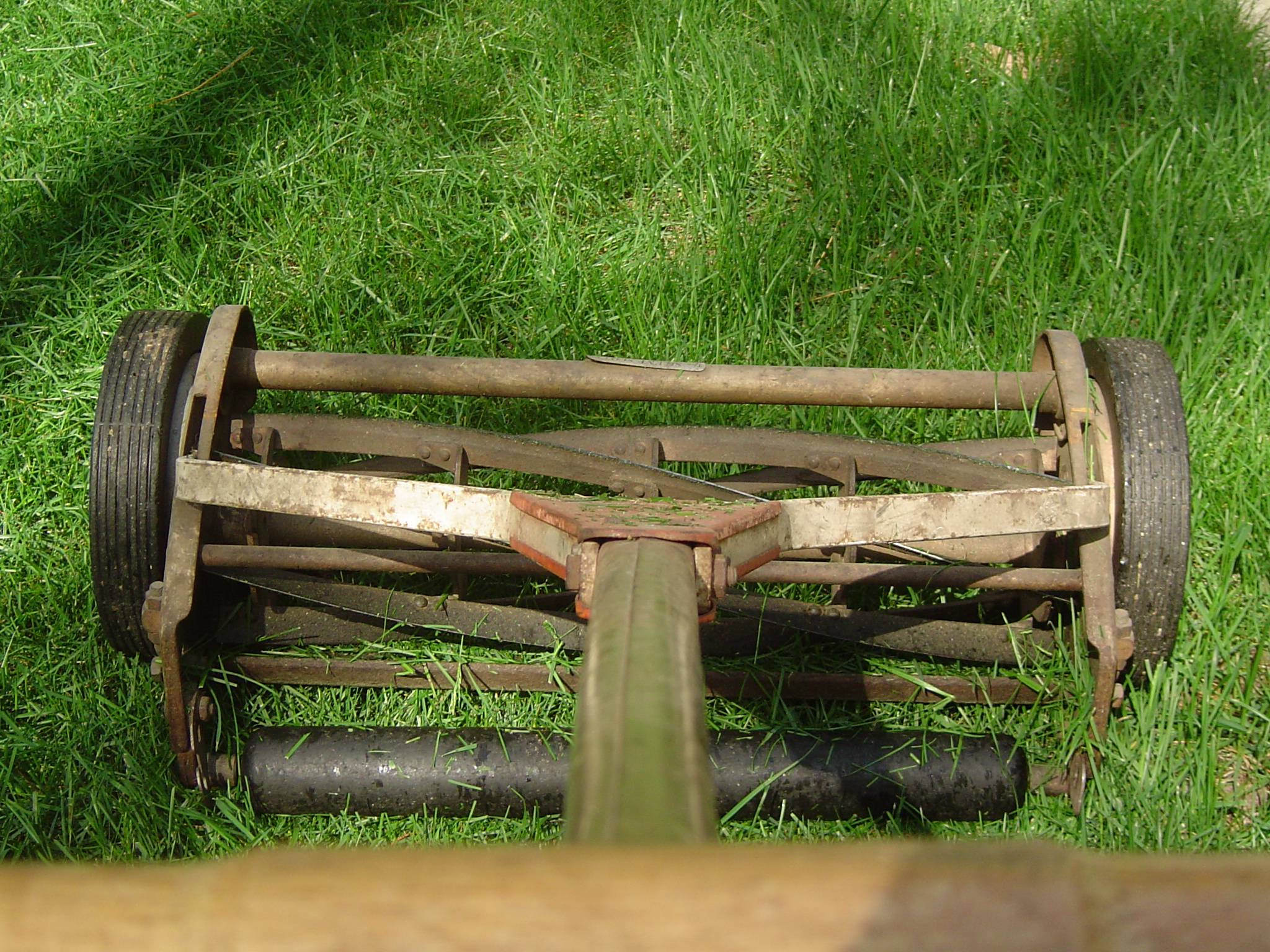
The smell of freshly cut grass is evident immediately after mechanical damage, such as that done by mowing the lawn.

The main compound responsible for the smell of freshly cut grass is cis-3-hexenal. It has a low odour detection threshold that humans can perceive at concentrations as low as 0.25 parts per billion. The compound is highly unstable and breaks down into trans-2-hexenal, which may account for why the smell is said to fade rapidly.

The composition of green leaf volatiles produced by cut grasses varies. In lawns, hayfields, and meadows, other plant species such as clover may be present. Sweet clover may impart a haylike or vanilla-like scent due to the presence of coumarin.

While grasses release small amounts of hydrocarbons passively and in response to strong sunlight, these emissions may increase by a factor of 180 when leaves are cut or damaged. Highly reactive hydrocarbons released by cut grass combine with gases such as nitrogen oxides and exacerbate photochemical smog and urban air pollution by contributing to the formation of aerosols and ozone. In cities, lawnmowing can account for 10% of the total hydrocarbon release into the atmosphere.

A second release of volatile organic compounds occurs after grass has been cut. An experiment analysing cut red fescue grass (Festuca rubra) and white clover (Trifolium repens) found prolonged releases of cis-3-hexenal, cis-3-hexenol, and hexenyl acetate. The emissions also included acetaldehyde, acetone, butanone, methanol, and possibly formaldehyde.

== Biological role ==
Green leaf volatiles (GLVs) are volatile organic compounds that play an important role in plant communication and plant defence against herbivory. The release of GLVs functions as a distress signal to other plants that danger is imminent. GLVs may also attract the predators of grass-eating insects, with insect and bird species having been shown to respond to GLV releases by certain injured plants.

== Human perception and olfactory memory ==
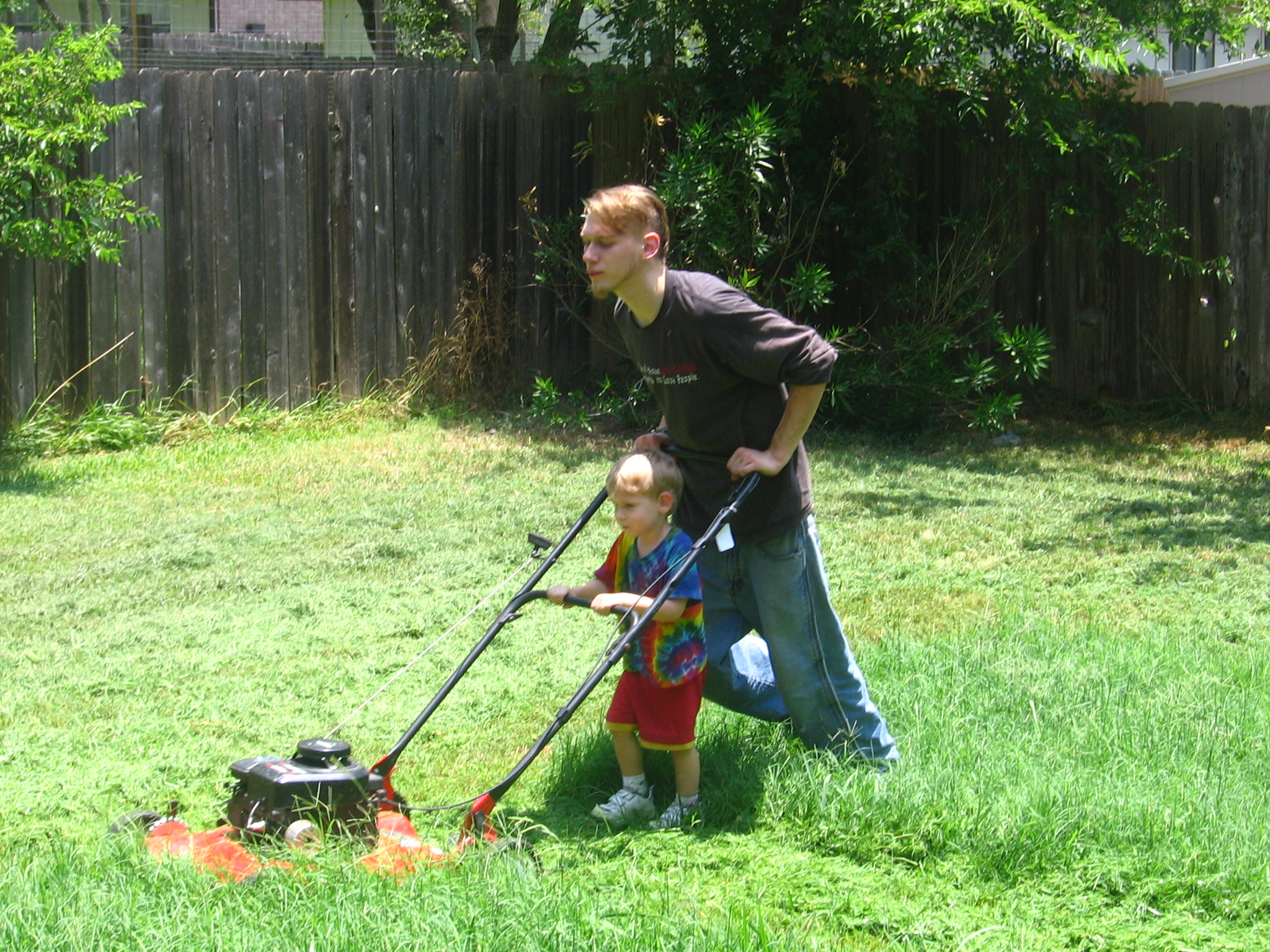
The smell of freshly cut grass may evoke associations with chores.

For humans, the smell of freshly cut grass is connected through olfactory memory to experiences related to lawns, lawn mowers, or haying. The smell may evoke nostalgia, eliciting associations with spring or summer, parklands, golf courses, or preparations for sporting events.

The smell of freshly cut grass is described as a leafy or "green" scent. Positive associations to GLVs released by grasses may be due to their similarity to the GLVs released by edible plants such as vegetables when they are ripe.

The smell of freshly cut grass has been described as "uplifting", and behavioral studies have shown that the smell has a "healing effect on psychological damage caused by stress". Hexanal, which resembles the smell of freshly cut grass, can increase interpersonal trust.

A trademark case before the Office for Harmonization in the Internal Market addressed an attempt to secure a trademark for the smell of freshly cut grass for use with tennis balls. An appeals board found that "the smell of freshly cut grass is a distinct smell which everyone immediately recognizes from experience. For many, the scent or fragrance of freshly cut grass reminds them of spring or summer, manicured lawns or playing fields, or other such pleasant experiences."

Happiness in childhood may have a bearing on the subjective experience of the smell. In one study, people born before 1960 recalled a happy childhood when describing the smell of freshly cut grass, while those born after 1960 described unhappy childhoods. Subjects born earlier had pride in the responsibility of cutting grass while those born later associated the smell with chores.

About 12% of humans have difficulty smelling cis-3-hexenol, a phenomenon which has been linked to a pair of single-nucleotide polymorphisms in the OR2J3 gene.

The toxic, colourless gas phosgene smells like freshly cut grass. The Mauzac-based sparkling wine Blanquette de Limoux has aromas of fresh cut grass.

== Use in industry ==
The chemicals responsible for the smell of freshly cut grass are used as aroma compounds by the perfume industry. Hexanal and related compounds are used by the food industry in recreating fruit and vegetable flavours. The yearly production of cis-3-Hexen-1-ol is about 30 tonnes. The compound, which has the smell of freshly cut grass, is naturally present in tomatoes, kiwifruit, olive oil, and green tea.

== See also ==
- Floral scent
- Olfactic communication
- Petrichor
