= Tetramethyltetrahydrofuran =

Tetramethyltetrahydrofuran may refer to:

- 2,2,5,5-Tetramethyltetrahydrofuran
- 3,3,4,4-Tetramethyltetrahydrofuran
