= Nikolai Lyubavin =

Russian chemist (1845-1918)

- Николай Николаевич Любавин
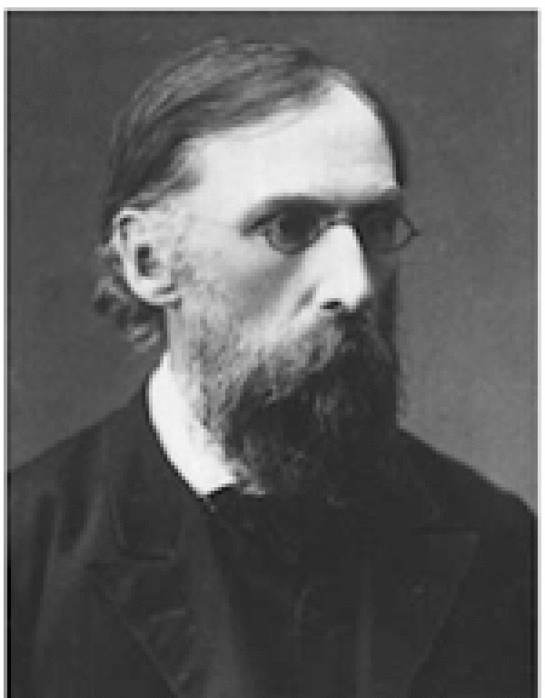
- Born: 22 April 1845; Saint Petersburg, Russian Empire
- Died: 17 December 1918 (aged 73); Moscow, RSFSR
- Education: Saint Petersburg University
- Awards: Order of St. Vladimir, 3rd class; Order of Saint Anna, 2nd class; Order of Saint Stanislaus, 2nd class
- Scientific career
- Fields: Organic chemistry, Technical chemistry
- Workplaces: Saint Petersburg University; Imperial Moscow University

Nikolai Nikolaevich Lyubavin (Russian: Николай Николаевич Любавин) (22 April 1845 – 17 December 1918) was a Russian chemist and university professor. He is known for his research in organic chemistry, specifically regarding pyridine compounds, and for his contributions to the development of technical chemistry education in Russia. He was also one of the first translators of Karl Marx's Das Kapital into Russian.

== Biography ==
Lyubavin was born on 22 April [O.S. 10 April] 1845 in Saint Petersburg to a Third Guild merchant family. He graduated from the Saint Petersburg Commercial School in 1862 and subsequently attended the Physics and Mathematics Faculty of Saint Petersburg University as an external auditor. There he attended lectures by Nikolai Sokolov and Dmitri Mendeleev, graduating in 1868 with a Candidate of Sciences degree.

Following his graduation, Lyubavin traveled abroad to continue his scientific education. From 1868 to 1870, he conducted postdoctoral research with Hermann Kolbe in Leipzig, Adolf von Baeyer in Berlin, Robert Bunsen and Albert Ladenburg in Heidelberg, and Marcellin Berthelot in Paris. Upon returning to Russia in February 1871, he joined the laboratory of Nikolai Menshutkin at Saint Petersburg University as a laboratory assistant in the analytical department, where he supervised students in quantitative analysis.

It was during his time as a student in Heidelberg in February 1870 that Lyubavin become involved with the translation of Das Kapital into Russian. He was caught up in a dispute between Marx's Russian publishers, Sergei Nechaev and Mikhail Bakunin about progress on the translation, and Nechaev angrily warned him in a letter to keep out of the project. Nechaev's letter suggests that Lyubavin's interest in Marx's work was financial rather than ideological.

== Scientific and academic career ==
=== Saint Petersburg University ===
In 1874, Lyubavin defended his Master's thesis, Ammoniacal Compounds of Valeric Aldehyde. By September 1880, he was appointed Privatdozent and began lecturing on chemistry. He taught a specialized course on nitrogenous organic substances titled "Glycines and Amides of Carbonic Acid" and, from 1885 to 1886, delivered a general course on technical chemistry.

His research at Saint Petersburg University focused primarily on organic chemistry. Lyubavin synthesized pyridine bases, established the cyclic structure of pyridine and quinoline, and identified the presence of -N=CH- double bonds in their molecules. In 1880, he developed a method for synthesizing amino acids through the interaction of aldehydes with ammonium cyanide. Using this method, he became the first to synthesize alanine from acetaldehyde and leucine from valeric aldehyde in 1881; these substances had previously been obtained only from proteins. During this period, he also compiled the textbook Physical Chemistry (1876–1877), one of the first printed guides on the subject in Russia.

=== Moscow University ===
In 1886, Lyubavin transferred to Imperial Moscow University. Following the departure of I. I. Kanonnikov, Lyubavin applied for the vacancy in the Faculty of Physics and Mathematics and was recommended for the position by Aleksandr Butlerov. He was initially enrolled as a Privatdozent. In 1887, he defended his doctoral dissertation, On Pyridine Compounds. He was promoted to Extraordinary Professor in 1890 and served as an Ordinary Professor in the Department of Technology and Technical Chemistry from 1898 to 1907.

At Moscow University, Lyubavin delivered lectures on technical chemistry. Under the University Statute of 1884, this course became an elective discipline. His curriculum covered the technology of building materials, metals, salts, acids, alkalis, fats, oils, wax, and food technology. He also organized factory excursions for students.

Lyubavin oversaw the construction of a new laboratory building for technical and agronomic chemistry, which began in 1903 and was completed in 1905. The facility included a technical museum, a library, a professor's office, workspaces for 24 students, and specialized rooms for calorimetric determinations and handling hazardous substances. The basement was equipped with furnaces and forges capable of reaching temperatures up to 1200°C. Although the building had electricity, Lyubavin opted to install gas lighting for the laboratories, regarding it as more reliable and economical for experimental work. He managed the acquisition of new instruments and donated his personal book collection to the laboratory library.

=== Later years ===
In 1901, having served a 25-year term, Lyubavin withdrew from the staff of full-time professors, though his service was extended for five years, the maximum timespan allowed for professors at that time. He retired in 1907, transferring the department leadership to his student, Aleksandr Nastyukov.

In retirement, Lyubavin focused on his comprehensive seven-volume work, Technical Chemistry. The first four volumes were published by 1908. The work was encyclopedic in scope, incorporating recent research and diagrams of industrial installations, with specific attention paid to industrial safety, such as smoke cleaning methods for metallurgical furnaces.

Lyubavin died on 17 December 1918. He was unable to complete the final volume of his textbook before his death; the work was subsequently finished by Nastyukov and published in the 1920s. In his 2005 review of Lyubavin's life, Professor Andrei Morachevskii said: "Lyubavin did much for the improvement of the quality of teaching of technical chemistry at Moscow University and played an important role in training of specialists for industry."

== Personal life ==
Lyubavin was married and had three children: two sons, Boris and Dmitry, and a daughter, Tatyana.

He held the civil rank of Active State Councillor and was awarded several orders:

- Order of St. Stanislaus, 2nd degree (1895)
- Order of St. Anna, 2nd degree (1896)
- Order of St. Vladimir, 3rd degree (1905)

== Selected works ==
Lyubavin authored numerous scientific papers and textbooks. His major publications include:

- Ammiachnye soedineniya valerianovogo aldegida [Ammoniacal Compounds of Valeric Aldehyde]. St. Petersburg: A. Benke, 1874.
- Fizicheskaya khimiya [Physical Chemistry]. St. Petersburg: I. I. Bilibin, 1876—1877.
- O piridinnykh soedineniyakh [On Pyridine Compounds]. Moscow: M. G. Volchaninov, 1887.
- Tekhnicheskaya khimiya [Technical Chemistry]. Moscow: University Press, 1897—1926. (7 volumes).
