= C8H14O4 =

The molecular formula C_{8}H_{14}O_{4} may refer to:

- Diethyl succinate
- Dimethyl adipate
- Ethyl acetoxy butanoate
- Fructone
- Suberic acid
- 2,2,3,3-Tetramethylsuccinic acid
