= Hexanal =

Chemical compound (C6H12O)

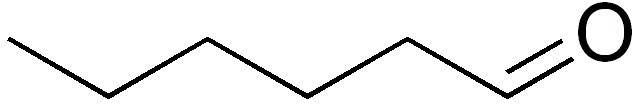

Names
- Preferred IUPAC name Hexanal
- Other names Hexanaldehyde; Aldehyde C-6; Caproic aldehyde Capronaldehyde

Identifiers
CAS Number	66-25-1
3D model (JSmol)	Interactive image
ChEBI	CHEBI:88528
ChEMBL	ChEMBL280331
ChemSpider	5949
ECHA InfoCard	100.000.567
PubChem CID	6184
UNII	9DC2K31JJQ
CompTox Dashboard (EPA)	DTXSID2021604
- InChI: InChI=1S/C6H12O/c1-2-3-4-5-6-7/h6H,2-5H2,1H3 Key: JARKCYVAAOWBJS-UHFFFAOYSA-N; InChI=1/C6H12O/c1-2-3-4-5-6-7/h6H,2-5H2,1H3 Key: JARKCYVAAOWBJS-UHFFFAOYAA
- SMILES: O=CCCCCC

Properties
Chemical formula	C_{6}H_{12}O
Molar mass	100.161 g·mol^{−1}
Appearance	Clear liquid
Density	0.815 g/cm^{3}
Melting point	< −20 °C (−4 °F; 253 K)
Boiling point	130 to 131 °C (266 to 268 °F; 403 to 404 K)
Magnetic susceptibility (χ)	−69.40·10^{−6} cm^{3}/mol

Related compounds
Related aldehydes	Pentanal Heptanal
- Except where otherwise noted, data are given for materials in their standard state (at 25 °C [77 °F], 100 kPa). verify (what is ?) Infobox references

Hexanal, also called hexanaldehyde or caproaldehyde is an alkyl aldehyde used in the flavor industry to produce fruity flavors. Its scent resembles freshly cut grass, like cis-3-hexenal. It is potentially useful as a natural extract that prevents fruit spoilage. It occurs naturally, and contributes to a hay-like "off-note" flavor in green peas.

The first synthesis of hexanal was published in 1907 by P. Bagard.
