= C7H10O =

The molecular formula C_{7}H_{10}O (molar mass: 110.15 g/mol, exact mass: 110.0732 u) may refer to:

- Norcamphor
- Tetrahydrobenzaldehyde, or 1,2,3,6-Tetrahydrobenzaldehyde
