= C8H14O =

The molecular formula C_{8}H_{14}O (molar mass: 126.20 g/mol, exact mass: 126.1045 u) may refer to:

- Cyclooctanone
- Filbertone
- Oct-1-en-3-one, or 1-octen-3-one
- Sulcatone, or 6-methyl-5-hepten-2-one
