= Octanone =

Octanone may refer to any of three isomeric chemical compounds:

- 2-Octanone
- 3-Octanone
- 4-Octanone
