= Acrolein =

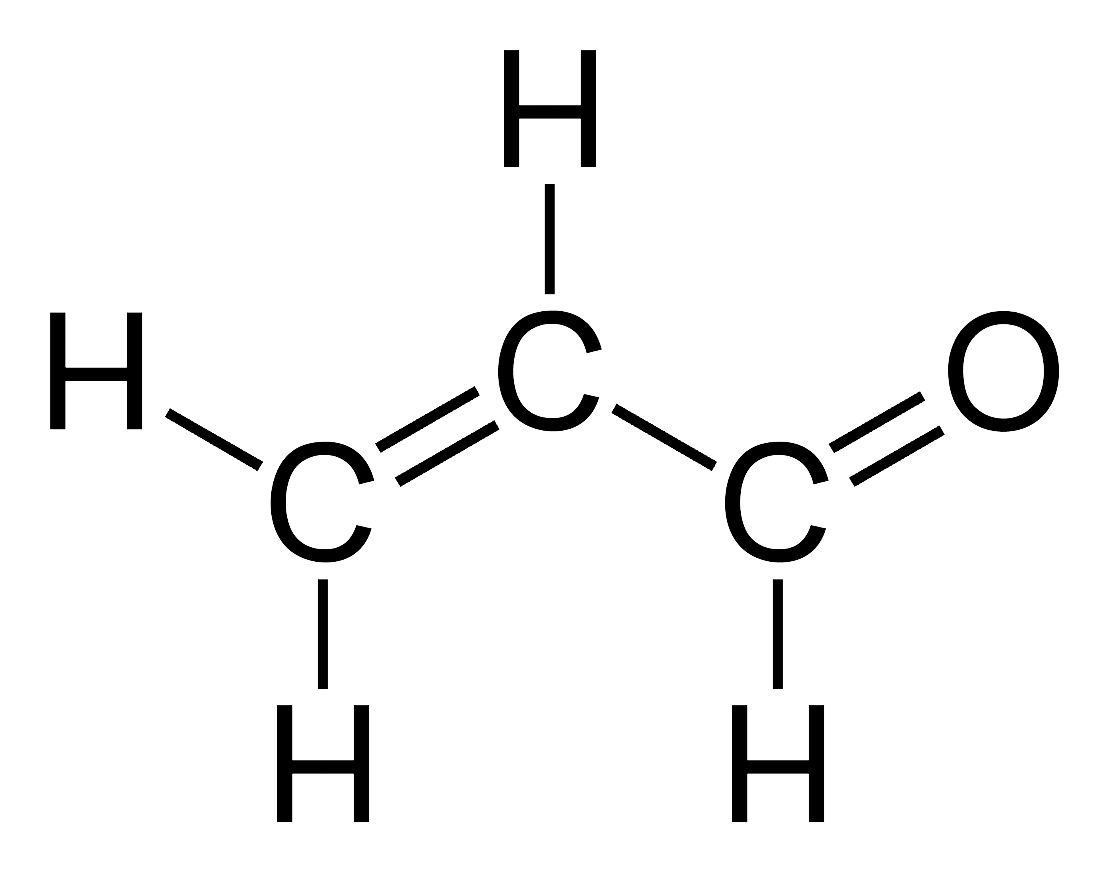

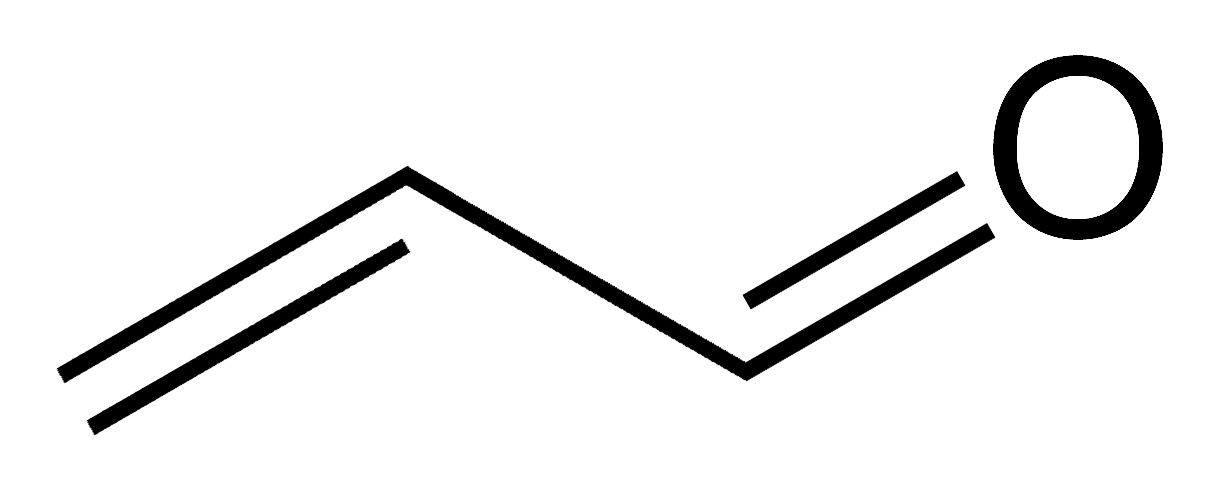

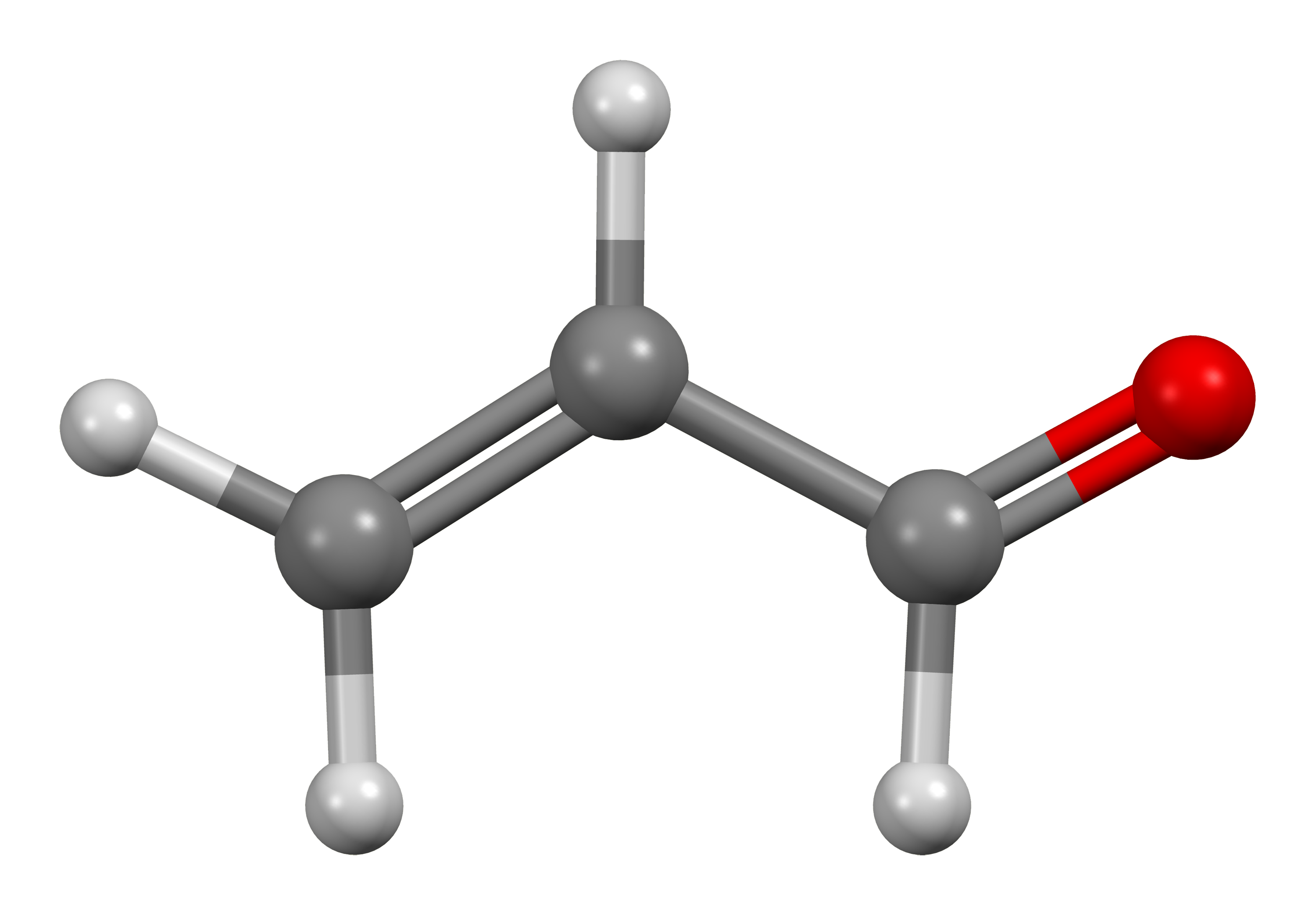

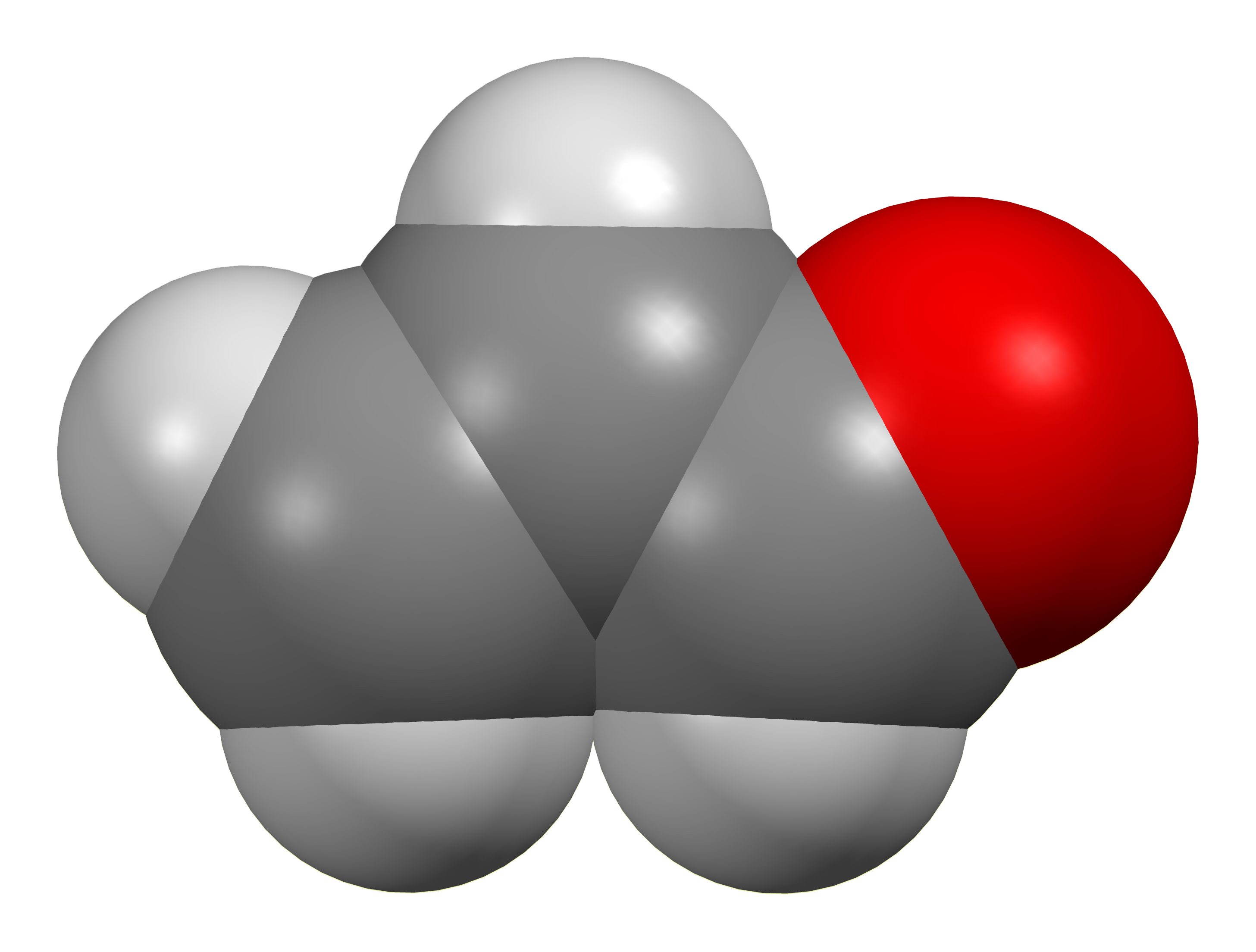

Names
- Preferred IUPAC name Prop-2-enal
- Other names Acraldehyde; Acrylic aldehyde Allyl aldehyde Ethylene aldehyde Acrylaldehyde

Identifiers
CAS Number	107-02-8
3D model (JSmol)	Interactive image; Interactive image
ChEBI	CHEBI:15368
ChEMBL	ChEMBL721
ChemSpider	7559
ECHA InfoCard	100.003.141
EC Number	203-453-4
IUPHAR/BPS	2418
KEGG	C01471
PubChem CID	7847
RTECS number	AS1050000
UNII	7864XYD3JJ
UN number	1092
CompTox Dashboard (EPA)	DTXSID5020023
- InChI: InChI=1S/C3H4O/c1-2-3-4/h2-3H,1H2 Key: HGINCPLSRVDWNT-UHFFFAOYSA-N; InChI=1/C3H4O/c1-2-3-4/h2-3H,1H2 Key: HGINCPLSRVDWNT-UHFFFAOYAQ
- SMILES: O=CC=C; C=CC=O

Properties
Chemical formula	C_{3}H_{4}O
Molar mass	56.064 g·mol^{−1}
Appearance	Colorless to yellow liquid. Colorless gas in smoke.
Odor	Acrid, Foul, Irritating
Density	0.839 g/mL
Melting point	−88 °C (−126 °F; 185 K)
Boiling point	53 °C (127 °F; 326 K)
Solubility in water	Appreciable (> 10%)
Vapor pressure	210 mmHg

Hazards
- Occupational safety and health (OHS/OSH)
Main hazards	Highly poisonous. Causes severe irritation to exposed membranes. Extremely flammable liquid and vapor.
- GHS labelling
Pictograms	(GHS02: Flammable) (GHS05: Corrosive) (GHS06: Toxic) (GHS08: Health hazard) (GHS09: Environmental hazard)
Signal word	Danger
Hazard statements	H225, H300, H311, H314, H330, H410
Precautionary statements	P210, P233, P240, P241, P242, P243, P260, P264, P270, P271, P273, P280, P284, P301+P310, P301+P330+P331, P302+P352, P303+P361+P353, P304+P340, P305+P351+P338, P310, P312, P320, P321, P330, P361, P363, P370+P378, P391, P403+P233, P403+P235, P405, P501
NFPA 704 (fire diamond)	4 3 3
Flash point	−26 °C (−15 °F; 247 K)
Autoignition temperature	278 °C (532 °F; 551 K)
Explosive limits	2.8–31%
- Lethal dose or concentration (LD, LC)
LC_{50} (median concentration)	875 ppm (mouse, 1 min); 175 ppm (mouse, 10 min); 150 ppm (dog, 30 min); 8 ppm (rat, 4 hr); 375 ppm (rat, 10 min); 25.4 ppm (hamster, 4 hr); 131 ppm (rat, 30 min)
LC_{Lo} (lowest published)	674 ppm (cat, 2 hr)
- NIOSH (US health exposure limits)
PEL (Permissible)	TWA 0.1 ppm (0.25 mg/m^{3})
REL (Recommended)	TWA 0.1 ppm (0.25 mg/m^{3}) ST 0.3 ppm (0.8 mg/m^{3})
IDLH (Immediate danger)	2 ppm
Safety data sheet (SDS)	Sigma-Aldrich SDS

Related compounds
Related alkenals	Crotonaldehyde cis-3-Hexenal (E,E)-2,4-Decadienal
- Except where otherwise noted, data are given for materials in their standard state (at 25 °C [77 °F], 100 kPa). verify (what is ?) Infobox references

Acrolein (systematic name: propenal) is the simplest unsaturated aldehyde. It is a colorless liquid with a foul and acrid aroma. The smell of burnt fat (as when cooking oil is heated to its smoke point) is caused by glycerol in the burning fat breaking down into acrolein. It is produced industrially from propylene and mainly used as a biocide and a building block to other chemical compounds, such as the amino acid methionine.

== History ==
Acrolein was first named and characterized as an aldehyde by the Swedish chemist Jöns Jacob Berzelius in 1839. He had been working with it as a thermal degradation product of glycerol, a material used in the manufacture of soap. The name is a contraction of 'acrid' (referring to its pungent smell) and 'oleum' (referring to its oil-like consistency). In the 20th century, acrolein became an important intermediate for the industrial production of acrylic acid and acrylic plastics.

== Production ==
Acrolein is prepared industrially by oxidation of propene. The process uses air as the source of oxygen and requires metal oxides as heterogeneous catalysts:

About 500,000 tons of acrolein are produced in this way annually in North America, Europe, and Japan. Additionally, all acrylic acid is produced via the transient formation of acrolein.

Propane represents a promising feedstock for the synthesis of acrolein (and acrylic acid).The main challenge is in fact the overoxidation to this acid.

When glycerol (also called glycerin) is heated to 280 °C, it decomposes into acrolein

This route is attractive when glycerol is co-generated in the production of biodiesel from vegetable oils or animal fats. The dehydration of glycerol has been demonstrated but has not proven competitive with the route from petrochemicals.

=== Niche or laboratory methods ===
The original industrial route to acrolein, developed by Degussa, involves aldol condensation of formaldehyde and acetaldehyde:

Acrolein may also be produced on lab scale by the action of potassium bisulfate on glycerol (glycerine).

== Reactions ==
Acrolein is a relatively electrophilic compound and a reactive one, hence its high toxicity. It is a good Michael acceptor, hence its useful reaction with thiols. It forms acetals readily, a prominent one being the spirocycle derived from pentaerythritol, diallylidene pentaerythritol. Acrolein participates in many Diels-Alder reactions, even with itself. Via Diels-Alder reactions, it is a precursor to some commercial fragrances, including myrac aldehyde ("lyral") and norbornene-2-carboxaldehyde. The monomer 3,4-epoxycyclohexylmethyl-3',4'-epoxycyclohexane carboxylate is also produced from acrolein via the intermediacy of tetrahydrobenzaldehyde.

== Uses ==
=== Military uses ===
Acrolein was used in warfare due to its irritant and blistering properties. The French used the chemical in their hand grenades and artillery shells during World War I under the name "Papite".

=== Biocide ===
Acrolein is mainly used as a contact herbicide to control submersed and floating weeds, as well as algae, in irrigation canals. It is used at a level of 10 ppm in irrigation and recirculating waters. In the oil and gas industry, it is used as a biocide in drilling waters, as well as a scavenger for hydrogen sulfide and mercaptans.

=== Chemical precursor ===
A number of useful compounds are made from acrolein, exploiting its bifunctionality. The amino acid methionine is produced by addition of methanethiol followed by the Strecker synthesis. Acrolein condenses with acetaldehyde and amines to give methylpyridines. It is also an intermediate in the Skraup synthesis of quinolines.

Acrolein will polymerize in the presence of oxygen and in water at concentrations above 22%. The color and texture of the polymer depends on the conditions. The polymer is a clear, yellow solid. In water, it will form a hard, porous plastic.

Acrolein has been used as a fixative in preparation of biological specimens for electron microscopy.

== Health risks ==
Acrolein is toxic and is a strong irritant for the skin, eyes, and nasal passages. The main metabolic pathway for acrolein is the alkylation of glutathione. The WHO suggests a "tolerable oral acrolein intake" of 7.5 μg per day per kg of body weight. Although acrolein occurs in French fries (and other fried foods), the levels are only a few μg per kg, meaning that one would have to consume more than their body weight in fries every day to surpass the limit set by the WHO. In response to occupational exposures to acrolein, the US Occupational Safety and Health Administration has set a permissible exposure limit at 0.1 ppm (0.25 mg/m^{3}) at an eight-hour time-weighted average. Acrolein acts in an immunosuppressive manner and may promote regulatory cells, thereby preventing the generation of allergies on the one hand, but also increasing the risk of cancer.

Acrolein was identified as one of the chemicals involved in the 2019 Kim Kim River toxic pollution incident.

=== Cigarette smoke ===
Connections exist between acrolein gas in the smoke from tobacco cigarettes and the risk of lung cancer. Acrolein is one of seven toxicants in cigarette smoke that are most associated with respiratory tract carcinogenesis. The mechanism of action of acrolein appears to involve induction of increased reactive oxygen species and DNA damage related to oxidative stress.

Acrolein is the most significant contributor to non-cancer related health risks in cigarette smoke, contributing 40 times more than the next component, hydrogen cyanide. The acrolein content in cigarette smoke depends on the type of cigarette and added glycerin, making up to 220 μg acrolein per cigarette. Importantly, while the concentration of the constituents in mainstream smoke can be reduced by filters, this has no significant effect on the composition of the side-stream smoke where acrolein usually resides, and which is inhaled by passive smoking. E-cigarettes, used normally, only generate "negligible" levels of acrolein (less than 10 μg "per puff").

=== Chemotherapy metabolite ===
Cyclophosphamide and ifosfamide treatment results in the production of acrolein. Acrolein produced during cyclophosphamide treatment collects in the urinary bladder and if untreated can cause hemorrhagic cystitis.

=== Endogenous production ===
Acrolein is a component of reuterin. Reuterin can be produced by gut microbes when glycerol is present. Microbe-produced reuterin is a potential resource of acrolein.

== Analytical methods ==
The "acrolein test" is for the presence of glycerin or fats. A sample is heated with potassium bisulfate, and acrolein is released if the test is positive. When a fat is heated strongly in the presence of a dehydrating agent such as potassium bisulfate (KHSO_{4}), the glycerol portion of the molecule is dehydrated to form the unsaturated aldehyde, acrolein (CH_{2}=CH–CHO), which has the odor peculiar to burnt cooking grease. More modern methods exist.

In the US, EPA methods 603 and 624.1 are designed to measure acrolein in industrial and municipal wastewater streams.
