= (E,E)-2,4-Decadienal =

- Skeletal formula of (E,E)-2,4-decadienal

Names
- Preferred IUPAC name (2E,4E)-Deca-2,4-dienal

Identifiers
CAS Number	25152-84-5
3D model (JSmol)	Interactive image
ChEBI	CHEBI:149547
ChEMBL	ChEMBL443949
ChemSpider	4446470
ECHA InfoCard	100.042.411
EC Number	246-668-9
MeSH	2-trans-4-trans-Decadienal
PubChem CID	5283349
UNII	3G88X2RK09
CompTox Dashboard (EPA)	DTXSID6024911
- InChI: InChI=1S/C10H16O/c1-2-3-4-5-6-7-8-9-10-11/h6-10H,2-5H2,1H3/b7-6+,9-8+ Key: JZQKTMZYLHNFPL-BLHCBFLLSA-N; InChI=1/C10H16O/c1-2-3-4-5-6-7-8-9-10-11/h6-10H,2-5H2,1H3/b7-6+,9-8+ Key: JZQKTMZYLHNFPL-BLHCBFLLBF
- SMILES: CCCCC\C=C\C=C\C=O

Properties
Chemical formula	C_{10}H_{16}O
Molar mass	152.237 g·mol^{−1}
Boiling point	115 °C; 239 °F; 388 K at 1.3 kPa
log P	3.419
Refractive index (n_{D})	1.515

Related compounds
Related alkenals	Acrolein Crotonaldehyde cis-3-Hexanal; 2-Nonenal
- Except where otherwise noted, data are given for materials in their standard state (at 25 °C [77 °F], 100 kPa). verify (what is ?) Infobox references

(E,E)-2,4-Decadienal is an aromatic substance found in butter, cooked beef, fish, potato chips, roasted peanut, buckwheat and wheat bread crumb. In an isolated state, it smells of deep fat flavor, characteristic of chicken aroma (at 10ppm). At lower concentration, it has the odor of citrus, orange or grapefruit. It might be carcinogenic. It has been used as aroma in the EU, but use restrictions apply until the required data have been submitted.
