= Green leaf volatiles =

Class of chemical compounds

Green leaf volatiles (GLV) are organic compounds released by plants. Some of these chemicals function as signaling compounds between either plants of the same species, of other species, or even different lifeforms like insects.

Green leaf volatiles are involved in patterns of attack and protection between species. They have been found to increase the attractive effect of pheromones of cohabiting insect species that protect plants from attacking insect species. For example, corn plants that are being fed on by caterpillars will release GLVs that attract wasps, who then attack the caterpillars. GLVs also have antimicrobial properties that can prevent infection at the site of injury.

GLVs include C6-aldehydes [(Z)-3-hexenal, n-hexanal] and their derivatives such as (Z)-3-hexenol, (Z)-3-hexen-1-yl acetate, and the corresponding E-isomers.

== Functions ==
When a plant is attacked, it emits GLVs into the environment through the air. How a plant responds depends on the type of damage involved. Plants respond differently to damage from a purely mechanical source and damage from herbivores. Mechanical damage tends to cause damage-associated molecular patterns (DAMPs) involving plant-derived substances and breakdown products. Herbivore-associated molecular patterns (HAMPs) involve characteristic molecules left by different types of herbivores when feeding. The oral secretions of herbivores appear to play an essential role in triggering the release of species-specific herbivore-induced plant volatiles. Wounds from herbivores, and mechanical wounds that have been treated with herbivore oral secretions, both trigger the release of higher quantities of plant volatiles than mechanical damage.

Volatile blends are proposed to convey a variety of information to insects and plants. "Each plant species and even each plant genotype releases its own specific blend, and the quantities and ratios in which they are released also vary with the arthropod that is feeding on a plant and may even provide information on the time of day that feeding occurs." In addition to GLVs, herbivore induced plant volatiles (HIPVs) include terpenes, ethylene, methyl salicylate and other VOCs.

GLVs activate the expression of genes related to the plants' defense mechanisms. Different antagonists trigger different expression of genes and the biosynthesis of signaling peptides which mediate systemic defense responses.

=== Plant–plant interactions ===
Undamaged neighboring plants have been shown, in some cases, to respond to GLV signals. Both the plant emitting the GLVs and its neighboring plants can enter a primed state in which plants activate their defenses systems more quickly and in a stronger concentration.

The first study to clearly demonstrate anti-herbivore defense priming by GLVs focused on corn (Zea mays). Neighboring plants responded to the release of GLVs by priming against insect herbivore attack, reacting more rapidly and releasing greater levels of GLVs. Similar results have been shown in tomato plants. Neighboring plants reacted more strongly to GLVs from the plants exposed to the herbivore, by releasing more of the proteins related to the plants' defense mechanisms.

=== Positive plant–insect interactions ===
In positive plant-insect interactions, GLVs are used as a form of defense. They attract predators to plants that are being preyed upon by herbivores. For example, female parasitoid wasps from two different families, Microplitis croceipes and Netelia heroica, can be attracted to plants that are emitting GLVs due to wounding from caterpillars. Maize plants emit volatiles to attract the parasitic wasps Cotesia marginiventris and Microplitis rufiventris to attack African cotton leafworm. In some species GLVs enhance the attraction of sex pheromones. For example, green leaf volatiles have been found to increase the response of tobacco budworm to sex pheromone. Budworm larvae feed on tobacco, cotton, and various flowers and weeds, and in turn can be fed on by the larvae of cohabiting species that are attracted by GLVs.

In another study, a multi-plant relationship was reported. The parasitic wasps (Vespula germanica and V. vulgaris) prey on caterpillar (Pieris brassicae)-infested cabbage leaves that emit GLVs. The same GLVs are emitted by the orchids (Epipactis purpurata and E. helleborine) through pheromone release. The orchids benefit from attracting the wasps, not to protect them from insects, but because the wasps aid in pollination.

Benefits of GLV release have also been reported in soybeans grown in Iowa. When these soybean plants became heavily infested by aphids, the amount of GLV released far surpassed normal levels and as a result, more spotted lady beetles were attracted to the pheromone releasing plants and preyed on the bugs eating the plant. The stimulus of aphid predation is chemically transmitted through the plant to coordinate an increase release of GLV's. The particular chemical released is unique to these spotted lady beetles and when different species of beetles were tested, there wasn't any extra inclination for them to move towards GLV releasing plants. This indicates that these soybeans evolved ability to release species-specific pheromones to aid in their survival.

=== Negative plant–insect interactions ===
GLV release is correlated with fruit ripeness. Although this may be of effect in attracting pollinators, it also can cause issues if these GLV's attract predators. One such example of this is with boll weevils, as an increase of GLV release when the plants are ripe has been found to increase the predation rate of these beetles.

Another issue with GLV release and increasing predation is with populations that alter GLV emissions from the affected plants. In one case, it was noted that secretions from certain species of caterpillars significantly decrease the effect amount of GLV emissions. In order to determine what was being done to decrease GLV emissions, a study was run on four unique species of caterpillars to measure their effectiveness in decreasing GLV levels released from the predated plant. It's been found that compounds in the gut and salivary glands, as well as modifications to those compounds in these various species, has been able to mute a large part of the effect of GLV released into the external environment. How this is done is through stopping the flow of pheromone molecules, so they can't interact with receptors on the leaves of other plants.

== Antimicrobial properties ==
GLVs can also have antimicrobial effects. Some plants express HPL, the main enzyme of GLV synthesis. The rates of fungal spore growth in HPL over-expressing have been compared with HPL silencing mutants to the wild type plants. Results from the study showed lower rates of fungal growth and higher GLV emissions on the HPL over-expressing mutants, while the HPL silencing mutants showed higher rates of fungal growth and lower GLV emissions, which supports the hypothesis that GLVs have antimicrobial properties.

The antimicrobial properties of GLVs have also been proposed to be part of an evolutionary arms race. During an infection, plants emit GLVs to act as microbial agents, but bacteria and viruses have adapted to use these GLVs to their own benefit. The most common example of this is found in the red raspberry. When the red raspberry plant is infected, the virus influences it to produce more GLVs, which attract the red raspberry aphid. These GLVs cause more aphids to come and to feed on the plant for longer, giving the virus better chances of being ingested and spread more widely. Researchers are now trying to determine whether under infectious conditions plants emit GLVs for their benefit, or if bacteria and viruses induce the release of these compounds for their own benefit. Studies in this area have been inconclusive and contradictory.

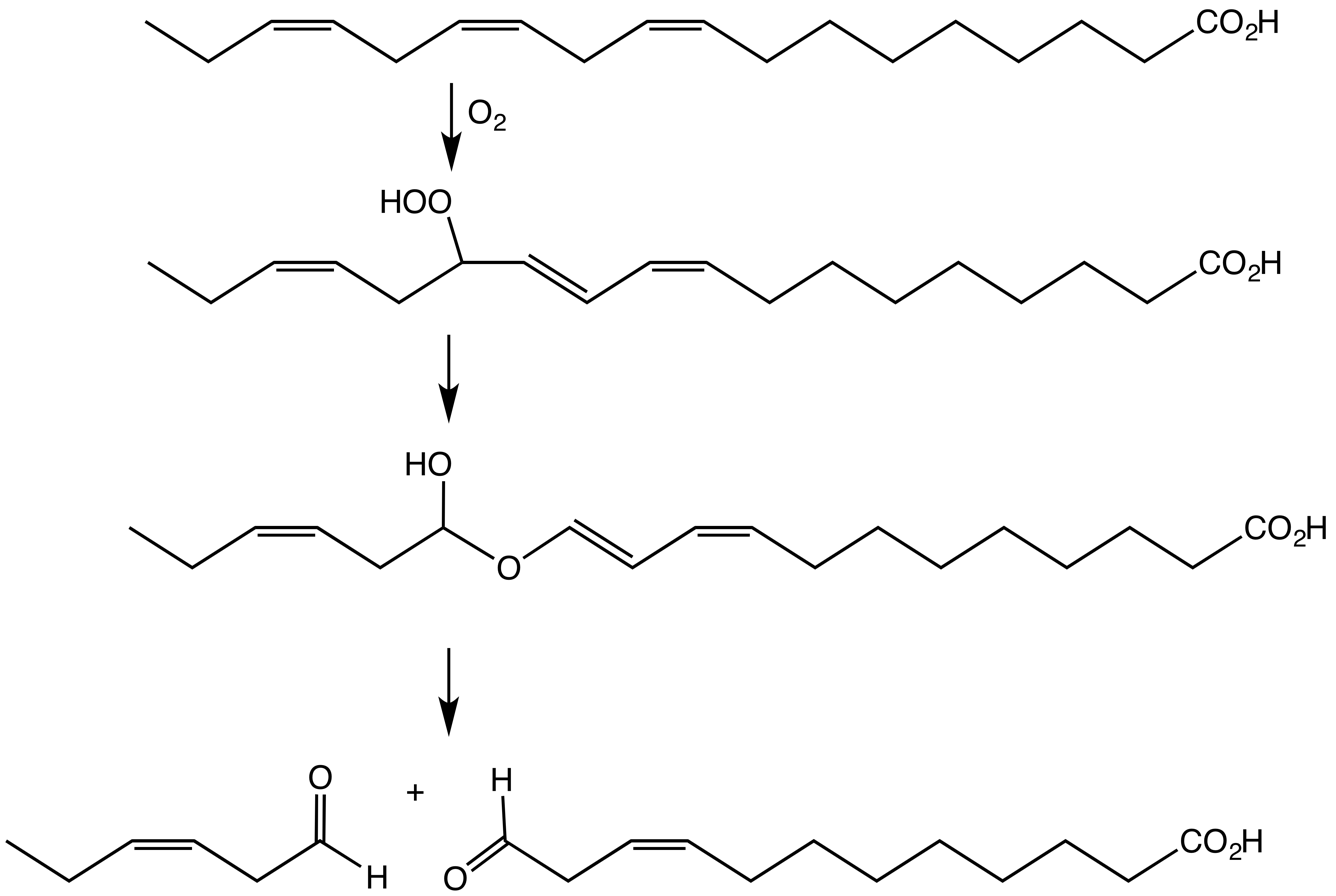
Pathway for biosynthesis of the GLV cis-3-hexenal from linolenic acid. The first step involves formation of the hydroperoxide by the action of a lipoxygenase. Subsequently a hydroperoxide lyase induces formation of the hemiacetal, the precursor to a volatile C6 compound.

== Study ==
A systematic review by Schuman 2023 finds that most studies on plant volatiles relate to herbivore interactions. Schuman also finds that laboratory studies are overrepresented despite the wide differences in herbivore behaviour between natural and artificial settings.

== See also ==
- Kairomone
- Plant defenses against herbivory
- Herbivore adaptations to plant defense
- Secondary metabolite
- Volatile Organic Compound
