= Cis-3-Hexen-1-ol =

cis-3-Hexen-1-ol

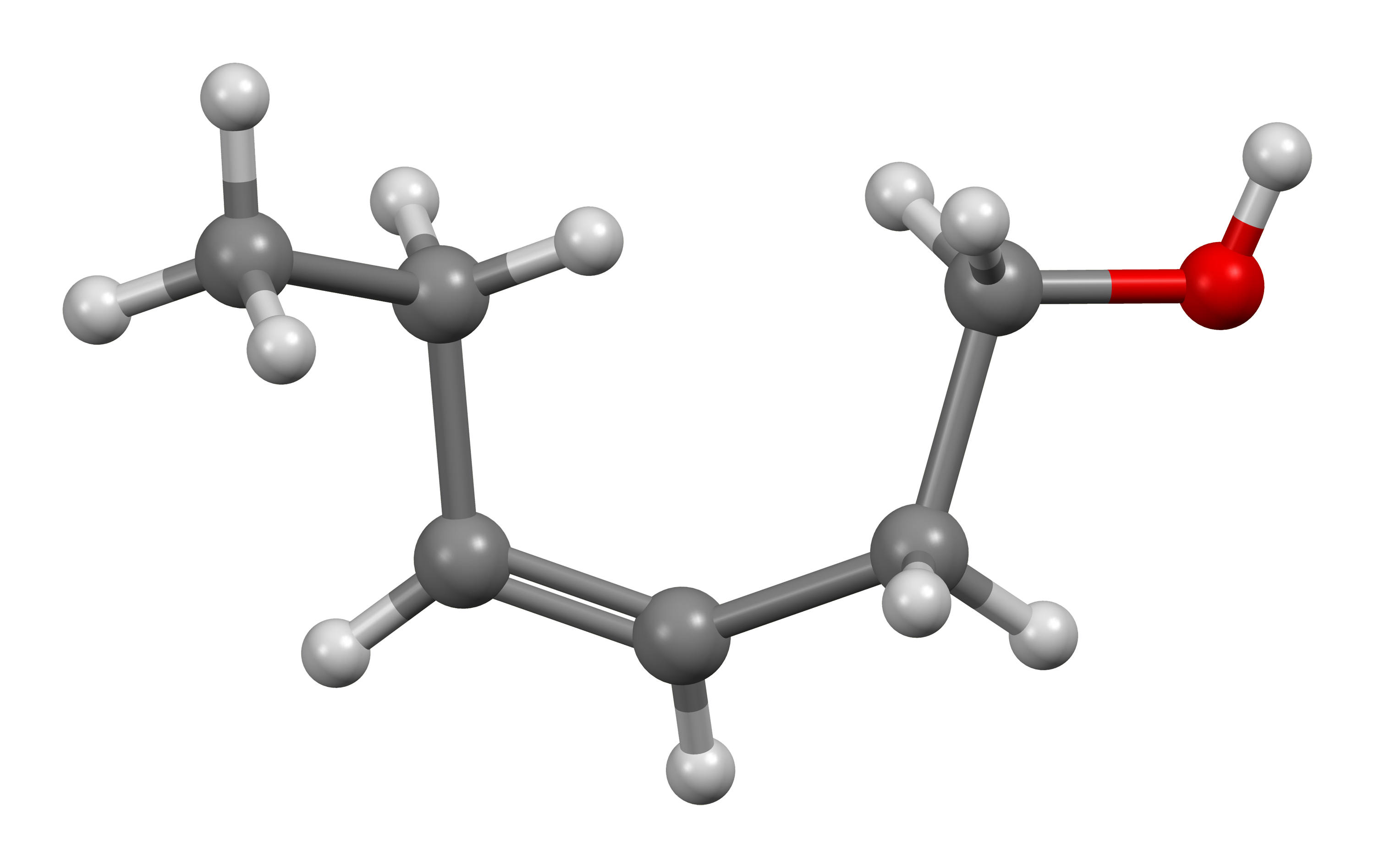

Names
- Preferred IUPAC name (3Z)-Hex-3-en-1-ol

Identifiers
CAS Number	928-96-1
3D model (JSmol)	Interactive image
ChEBI	CHEBI:28857
ChemSpider	21105914
ECHA InfoCard	100.011.994
EC Number	231-192-8
KEGG	C08492
PubChem CID	5281167
RTECS number	MP8400000
UNII	V14F8G75P4
CompTox Dashboard (EPA)	DTXSID6022137
- InChI: InChI=1S/C6H12O/c1-2-3-4-5-6-7/h3-4,7H,2,5-6H2,1H3/b4-3- Key: UFLHIIWVXFIJGU-ARJAWSKDSA-N; InChI=1/C6H12O/c1-2-3-4-5-6-7/h3-4,7H,2,5-6H2,1H3/b4-3- Key: UFLHIIWVXFIJGU-ARJAWSKDBI
- SMILES: CC\C=C/CCO

Properties
Chemical formula	C_{6}H_{12}O
Molar mass	100.159 g/mol
Appearance	colorless liquid
Density	0.846 g/cm^{3}
Melting point	−61 °C (−78 °F; 212 K)
Boiling point	156.5 °C (313.7 °F; 429.6 K)
Solubility in water	very slightly soluble
Solubility	soluble in ethanol, ether

Hazards
NFPA 704 (fire diamond)	0 2 0
Flash point	44 °C (111 °F)
- Lethal dose or concentration (LD, LC)
LD_{50} (median dose)	4700 mg/kg (rat, oral)
Safety data sheet (SDS)	External MSDS
- Except where otherwise noted, data are given for materials in their standard state (at 25 °C [77 °F], 100 kPa). verify (what is ?) Infobox references

cis-3-Hexen-1-ol, also known as (Z)-3-hexen-1-ol and leaf alcohol, is a colorless oily liquid with an intense grassy-green odor of freshly cut green grass and leaves. It is produced in small amounts by most plants and it acts as an attractant to many predatory insects. It is prized for its intensely fresh, green, and natural character, and it is essential for creating authentic fruit, vegetable, and herbal flavour profiles. In fragrance formulation, cis-3-hexen-1-ol is essential for creating green, fresh, and outdoor-inspired scents, appearing in iconic perfumes such as Chanel No. 19 and Cristalle.

It has been evaluated by FDA, JECFA and International Fragrance Association. The global production volume is about 3000 tonnes. Major cis-3-hexenol manufacturers include ZEON, NHU, and some Chinese companies like Sinofi. Its esters are also important flavor and fragrance raw materials.

The related aldehyde cis-3-hexenal (leaf aldehyde) has a similar and even stronger smell but is relatively unstable and isomerizes into the conjugated trans-2-hexenal.

This compound has been recognized as a semiochemical involved in mechanisms and behaviors of attraction in diverse animals such as insects and mammals.

== Human odor perception ==
A pair of two single-nucleotide polymorphisms, both in the gene for the OR2J3 odor receptor, strongly reduce sensitivity to this odorant.
