= 3,4-Epoxycyclohexanecarboxylate methyl ester =

Names
- Preferred IUPAC name Methyl 7-oxabicyclo[4.1.0]heptane-3-carboxylate

Identifiers
CAS Number	41088-52-2
3D model (JSmol)	Interactive image
ChemSpider	11227215
PubChem CID	12770164
CompTox Dashboard (EPA)	DTXSID00884680
- InChI: InChI=1S/C8H12O3/c1-10-8(9)5-2-3-6-7(4-5)11-6/h5-7H,2-4H2,1H3 Key: QCGKUFZYSPBMAY-UHFFFAOYSA-N
- SMILES: COC(=O)C1CCC2C(C1)O2

Properties
Chemical formula	C_{8}H_{12}O_{3}
Molar mass	156.181 g·mol^{−1}
Appearance	Colorless liquid
Boiling point	109.5–110.5 °C (229.1–230.9 °F; 382.6–383.6 K) (17 mmHg)
- Except where otherwise noted, data are given for materials in their standard state (at 25 °C [77 °F], 100 kPa). Infobox references

3,4-Epoxycyclohexanecarboxylate methyl ester refers to organic compounds with the formula C_{6}H_{9}OCO_{2}CH_{3}. These are bifunctional compounds consisting of an ester and cycloaliphatic epoxide groups. It exists as two diastereomers both of which are chiral. These species are of interest in polymer chemistry.

== Synthese and reactions ==
3,4-Epoxycyclohexanecarboxylate methyl ester is prepared by epoxidation of 4-cyclohexenecarboxylate methyl ester with peracid. It is a crosslinking agent in the production of epoxy resins. 3,4-Epoxycyclohexanecarboxylate methyl ester itself would give a linear polymer when homopolymerized.

== Properties ==
3,4-Epoxycyclohexanecarboxylate methyl ester has a viscosity of 6 mPa·s.
