= Cis-3-Hexenal =

cis-3-Hexenal

Names
- Preferred IUPAC name (3Z)-Hex-3-enal
- Other names (Z)-Hex-3-enal cis-3-Hexenal; Leaf aldehyde

Identifiers
| CAS Number | 6789-80-6 |
| 3D model (JSmol) | Interactive image |
| ChEBI | CHEBI:23292 |
| ChemSpider | 559032 |
| ECHA InfoCard | 100.027.141 |
| EC Number | 229-854-4 |
| KEGG | C16310 |
| PubChem CID | 643941 |
| UNII | 6V54TKA96C |
| CompTox Dashboard (EPA) | DTXSID30884335 |
- InChI: InChI=1/C6H10O/c1-2-3-4-5-6-7/h3-4,6H,2,5H2,1H3/b4-3- Key: GXANMBISFKBPEX-ARJAWSKDBM
- SMILES: O=CC\C=C/CC

Properties
| Chemical formula | C_{6}H_{10}O |
| Molar mass | 98.145 g·mol^{−1} |
| Density | 0.851 g/cm^{3} |
| Boiling point | 126 °C (259 °F; 399 K) |

Related compounds
| Related alkenals | Acrolein Crotonaldehyde (E,E)-2,4-Decadienal |
- Except where otherwise noted, data are given for materials in their standard state (at 25 °C [77 °F], 100 kPa). Infobox references

cis-3-Hexenal, also known as (Z)-3-hexenal and leaf aldehyde, is an organic compound with the formula CH_{3}CH_{2}CH=CHCH_{2}CHO. It is classified as an unsaturated aldehyde. It is a colorless liquid and an aroma compound with an intense odor of freshly cut grass and leaves.

== Occurrence ==
It is one of the major volatile compounds in ripe tomatoes, although it tends to isomerize into the conjugated trans-2-hexenal. It is produced in small amounts by most plants and it acts as an attractant to many predatory insects. It is also a pheromone in many insect species.

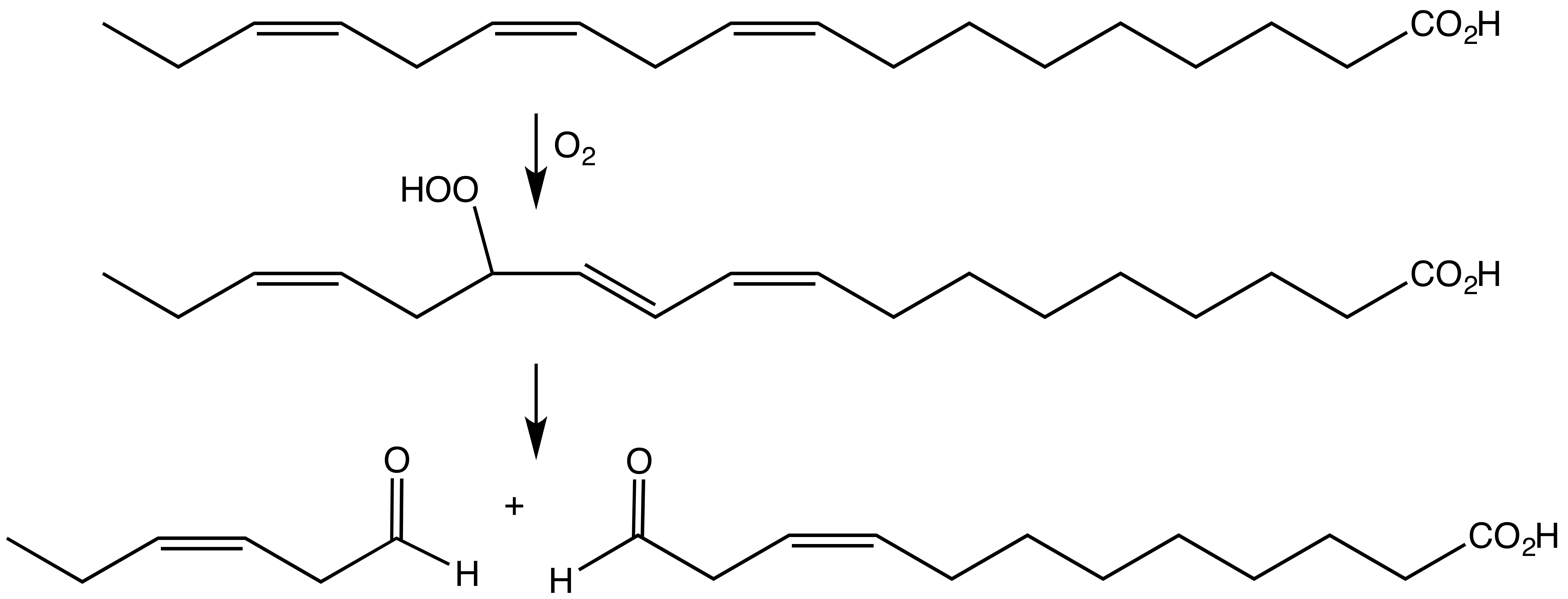
Biosynthesis of cis-3-hexenal from linolenic acid via the hydroperoxide by the action of a lipoxygenase followed by a hydroperoxide lyase.

== See also ==
- cis-3-Hexen-1-ol has a similar but weaker odor and is used in flavors and perfumes.
- 1-Hexanol, another volatile organic compound, also considered responsible for the freshly mowed grass odor
