= Pentanal =

Organic compound (C4H9CHO)

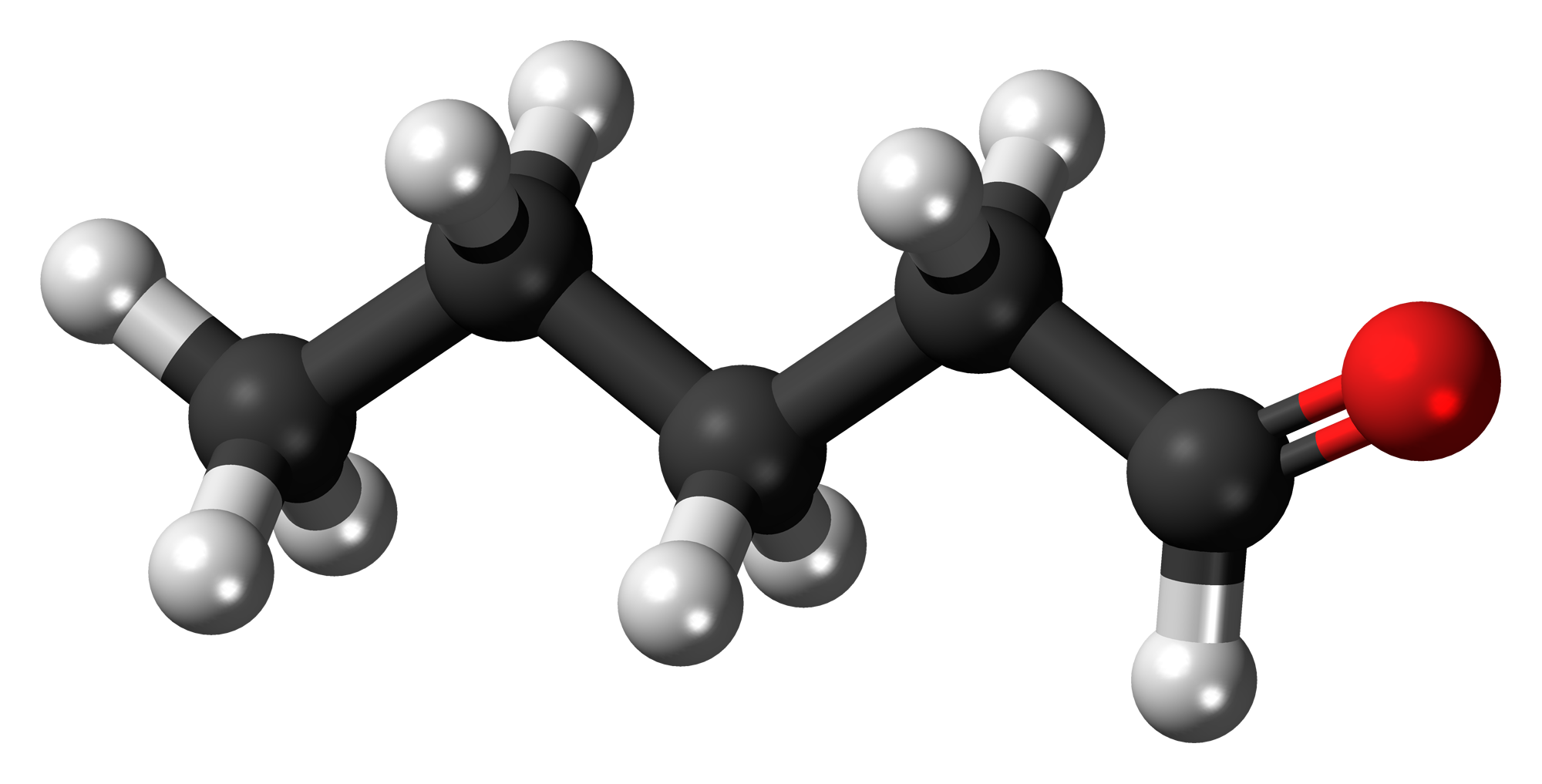

Names
- Preferred IUPAC name Pentanal
- Other names Pentanaldehyde; Valeraldehyde; Valeric aldehyde

Identifiers
CAS Number	110-62-3
3D model (JSmol)	Interactive image
ChEBI	CHEBI:84069
ChemSpider	7772
DrugBank	DB01919
ECHA InfoCard	100.003.442
PubChem CID	8063
UNII	B975S3014W
UN number	2058
CompTox Dashboard (EPA)	DTXSID7021653
- InChI: InChI=1S/C5H10O/c1-2-3-4-5-6/h5H,2-4H2,1H3 Key: HGBOYTHUEUWSSQ-UHFFFAOYSA-N; InChI=1/C5H10O/c1-2-3-4-5-6/h5H,2-4H2,1H3 Key: HGBOYTHUEUWSSQ-UHFFFAOYAJ
- SMILES: O=CCCCC

Properties
Chemical formula	C_{5}H_{10}O
Molar mass	86.134 g·mol^{−1}
Appearance	Clear liquid
Odor	Fermented, bready, fruity, nutty, berry-like
Density	0.8095 at 20 °C
Melting point	−60 °C (−76 °F; 213 K)
Boiling point	102 to 103 °C (216 to 217 °F; 375 to 376 K)
Solubility in water	14 g/L (20 °C)
Vapor pressure	0.35 kPa (20 °C)
Viscosity	0.6 mPa·s (20 °C)

Hazards
- GHS labelling
Pictograms	(GHS02: Flammable) (GHS07: Exclamation mark)
NFPA 704 (fire diamond)	3 3 0
Flash point	12 °C (54 °F; 285 K)
Autoignition temperature	220 °C (428 °F; 493 K)
- Lethal dose or concentration (LD, LC)
LD_{50} (median dose)	3200 mg/kg (oral, rat); 4860 mg/kg (dermal, rabbit)
LC_{50} (median concentration)	14.3 ppm (rat, 4h)
- NIOSH (US health exposure limits)
PEL (Permissible)	none
REL (Recommended)	TWA 50 ppm (175 mg/m^{3})
IDLH (Immediate danger)	N.D.
Safety data sheet (SDS)	Fisher Scientific

Related compounds
Related aldehydes	Butyraldehyde Hexanal
- Except where otherwise noted, data are given for materials in their standard state (at 25 °C [77 °F], 100 kPa). verify (what is ?) Infobox references

Pentanal (also called valeraldehyde) is the organic compound with molecular formula C_{4}H_{9}CHO. Classified as an alkyl aldehyde, it is a colorless volatile liquid. Its odor is described as fermented, bready, fruity, nutty, or berry-like.

== Production ==
Pentanal is obtained by hydroformylation of butene. Also C4 mixtures can be used as starting material like the so-called raffinate II, which is produced by steam cracking and contains (Z)- and (E)-2-butene, 1-butene, butane and isobutane. The conversion to the product is accomplished with synthesis gas in the presence of a catalyst consisting of a rhodium-bisphosphite complex and a sterically hindered secondary amine with a selectivity toward pentanal of at least 90%.

== Use ==
Pentanal undergoes the reactions characteristic of any alkyl aldehyde, i.e., oxidations, condensations, and reductions. 2-Octanone, produced for use in the fragrance industry, is obtained by the condensation of acetone and pentanal, followed by hydrogenation of the alkene.

2-Propyl-2-heptenal is obtained from pentanal by aldol condensation, which is hydrogenated to the saturated branched 2-propylheptanol. This alcohol serves as a starting material for the PVC plasticizer di-2-propylheptyl phthalate (DPHP).

Pentanal (valeraldehyde) is oxidized to give valeric acid.
