= 2,2,3,3-Tetramethylsuccinic acid =

Names
- Preferred IUPAC name Tetramethylbutanedioic acid
- Other names 2,2,3,3-Tetramethylbutane-1,4-dioic acid; 2,2,3,3-Tetramethylsuccinic acid; tetramethyl succinic acid

Identifiers
CAS Number	630-51-3
3D model (JSmol)	Interactive image
ChemSpider	120224
ECHA InfoCard	100.242.673
EC Number	811-900-5
PubChem CID	136453
UNII	NG22HEH2M7
CompTox Dashboard (EPA)	DTXSID30212210
- InChI: InChI=1S/C8H14O4/c1-7(2,5(9)10)8(3,4)6(11)12/h1-4H3,(H,9,10)(H,11,12) Key: CDPPYCZVWYZBJH-UHFFFAOYSA-N
- SMILES: CC(C)(C(=O)O)C(C)(C)C(=O)O

Properties
Chemical formula	C_{8}H_{14}O_{4}
Molar mass	174.196 g·mol^{−1}
Density	1.161 g/cm^{3}
Melting point	204–206 °C (399–403 °F; 477–479 K)
Boiling point	259.6 °C (499.3 °F; 532.8 K) 760 mmHg
Refractive index (n_{D})	1.474

Hazards
- GHS labelling
Pictograms	(GHS05: Corrosive) (GHS07: Exclamation mark)
Signal word	Danger
Hazard statements	H302, H312, H315, H318, H332, H335
Precautionary statements	P261, P264, P270, P271, P280, P301+P312, P302+P352, P304+P312, P304+P340, P305+P351+P338, P310, P312, P321, P322, P330, P332+P313, P362, P363, P403+P233, P405, P501
Flash point	125.1 °C (257.2 °F; 398.2 K)
- Except where otherwise noted, data are given for materials in their standard state (at 25 °C [77 °F], 100 kPa). Infobox references

In chemistry, 2,2,3,3-tetramethylsuccinic acid or 2,2,3,3-tetramethylbutane-1,4-dioic acid is a dicarboxylic acid with the formula C_{8}H_{14}O_{4}, or HOOC-C(CH_{3})_{2}-C(CH_{3})_{2}-COOH.

It can be seen as derivative of succinic acid (butane-1,4-dioic acid) with two methyl groups replacing two hydrogen atoms on each of the central carbon atoms of the chain.

== Synthesis and chemistry ==
The compound can also be obtained by thermal decomposition of 2,2,3,3-tetramethyl-4-one-glutaric acid with release of a carbon monoxide molecule.

On heating it forms a heterocyclic anhydride, 3,3,4,4-tetramethyltetrahydrofuran-2,5-dione, with loss of one molecule of water.
