= 3,3,4,4-Tetramethyltetrahydrofuran-2,5-dione =

Names
- Preferred IUPAC name 3,3,4,4-Tetramethyloxolane-2,5-dione
- Other names Tetrahydro-3,3,4,4-tetramethylfuran-2,5-dione; 3,3,4,4-tetramethytetrahydrofuran-2,5-quinone; dihydro-3,3,4,4-tetramethyl-2,5-furandione; tetramethylsuccinic anhydride; TMSA

Identifiers
CAS Number	35046-68-5
3D model (JSmol)	Interactive image
ChemSpider	125215
PubChem CID	141941
UNII	G3SNF582YQ
CompTox Dashboard (EPA)	DTXSID00188554
- InChI: InChI=1S/C8H12O3/c1-7(2)5(9)11-6(10)8(7,3)4/h1-4H3 Key: KYZIXHLDWJBHDI-UHFFFAOYSA-N
- SMILES: CC1(C(=O)OC(=O)C1(C)C)C

Properties
Chemical formula	C_{8}H_{12}O_{3}
Molar mass	156.181 g·mol^{−1}
Appearance	White crystalline
Density	1.044 g/cm^{3}
Melting point	147 °C (297 °F; 420 K)
Boiling point	226.1 °C (439.0 °F; 499.2 K) 760mmHg
Refractive index (n_{D})	1.434

Hazards
Flash point	93.2 °C (199.8 °F; 366.3 K)
- Except where otherwise noted, data are given for materials in their standard state (at 25 °C [77 °F], 100 kPa). Infobox references

In chemistry, 3,3,4,4-tetramethyltetrahydrofuran-2,5-dione is a heterocyclic compound with the formula C_{8}H_{12}O_{3}, or (CH_{3})_{2}(COC_{2}COO)(CH_{3})_{2}. It is a white crystalline solid with a pungent camphoraceous odor.

The compound is also called 3,3,4,4-tetramethyloxolane-2,5-dione (its IUPAC name) or 3,3,4,4-tetramethylsuccinic anhydride, namely the anhydride of 2,2,3,3-tetramethylsuccinic acid, and sometimes abbreviated as TMSA. It can be seen as derivative of tetrahydrofuran-2,5-dione (oxolane-2,5-dione) with two methyl groups replacing two hydrogen atoms on each of the carbon atoms in the ring that are not adjacent to the ring oxygen.

== Synthesis and chemistry ==
The compound is soluble in petroleum ether.

The compound was described in 1890 by Karl von Auwers and Victor Meyer who obtained it by thermal decomposition of 2,2,3,3-tetramethylsuccinic acid. It can also be obtained, in > 50% yield, from 3,3,4,4-tetramethylpyrrolidine-2,5-dione Other synthesis routes include

- treatment of 2,2'-Azobis(2-methylpropionitrile) with sulfuric acid (1896)
- decomposition of the hydroxy-lactone of 2,2,3,3-tetramethyl-1-one-glutaric acid with release of carbon monoxide (1927)

== See also ==
- 3,3,4,4-Tetramethyltetrahydrofuran
- 2,2,5,5-Tetramethyltetrahydrofuran-3,4-dione
