= Tetrahydrobenzaldehyde =

Names
- Preferred IUPAC name Cyclohex-3-ene-1-carbaldehyde
- Other names: 3-Cyclohexene-1-carbaldehyde; 4-Formyl-1-cyclohexene

Identifiers
| CAS Number | 100-50-5 |
| 3D model (JSmol) | Interactive image |
| ChEMBL | ChEMBL3188123 |
| ChemSpider | 21106029 |
| ECHA InfoCard | 100.002.599 |
| EC Number | 202-858-3 |
| PubChem CID | 7508 |
| UNII | GAK9539347 |
| UN number | 2498 |
| CompTox Dashboard (EPA) | DTXSID1026661 |
- InChI: InChI=1S/C7H10O/c8-6-7-4-2-1-3-5-7/h1-2,6-7H,3-5H2 Key: DCFDVJPDXYGCOK-UHFFFAOYSA-N
- SMILES: C1CC(CC=C1)C=O

Properties
| Chemical formula | C_{7}H_{10}O |
| Molar mass | 110.156 g·mol^{−1} |
| Appearance | Colorless liquid |
| Density | 0.94 g/mL |
| Melting point | 2 °C (36 °F; 275 K) |
| Boiling point | 163–164 °C (325–327 °F; 436–437 K) |
| Solubility | Acetone methanol |

Hazards
- GHS labelling
| Pictograms | (GHS02: Flammable) (GHS05: Corrosive) (GHS07: Exclamation mark) |
| Signal word | Danger |
| Hazard statements | H226, H312, H314, H315, H319, H335 |
| Precautionary statements | P210, P233, P240, P241, P242, P243, P260, P264, P271, P280, P301+P330+P331, P302+P352, P303+P361+P353, P304+P340, P305+P351+P338, P310, P312, P321, P322, P332+P313, P337+P313, P362, P363, P370+P378, P403+P233, P403+P235, P405, P501 |
| Flash point | 57 °C (135 °F; 330 K) |
- Except where otherwise noted, data are given for materials in their standard state (at 25 °C [77 °F], 100 kPa). Infobox references

1,2,3,6-Tetrahydrobenzaldehyde is an organic compound with the formula C_{6}H_{9}CHO. This colorless liquid is formally a partially hydrogenated derivative of benzaldehyde. It is produced by the Diels-Alder reaction of acrolein to butadiene. It is of interest as a precursor to 3,4-epoxycyclohexylmethyl-3′,4′-epoxycyclohexane carboxylate, a useful resin and precursor to industrial coatings. The conversion entails the Tishchenko reaction, i.e., base-catalyzed conversion to the ester followed by double epoxidation.

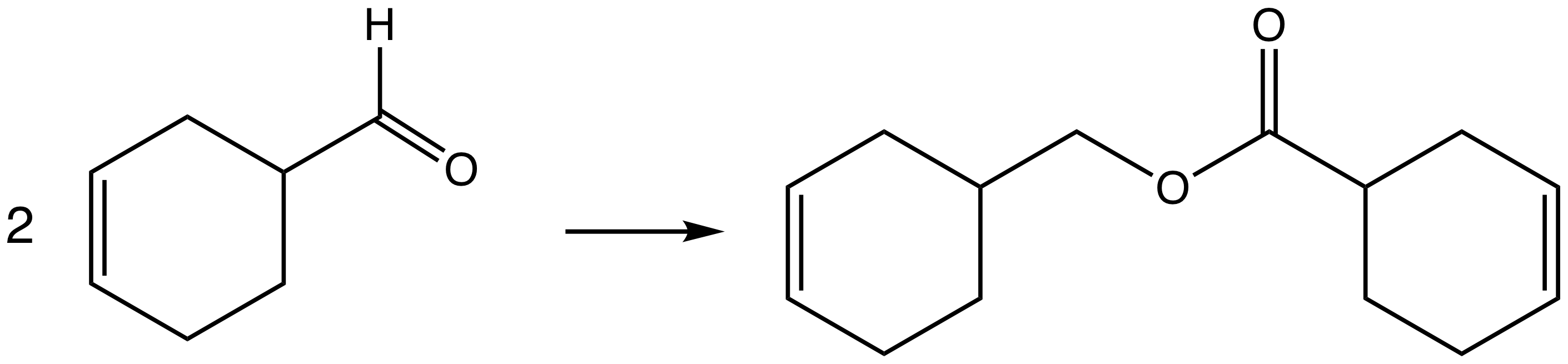
Tishchenko reaction of tetrahydrobenzaldehyde
