= Hydroperoxide lyase =

Class of enzymes

Identifiers
- EC no.: 4.2.99.-

Databases
- IntEnz: IntEnz view
- BRENDA: BRENDA entry
- ExPASy: NiceZyme view
- KEGG: KEGG entry
- MetaCyc: metabolic pathway
- PRIAM: profile
- PDB structures: RCSB PDB PDBe PDBsum
Search
- PMC: articles
- PubMed: articles
- NCBI: proteins

Hydroperoxide lyases are enzymes that catalyze the cleavage of C-C bonds in the hydroperoxides of fatty acids. They belong to the cytochrome P450 enzyme family (CYP74C and CYP74B).

Polyunsaturated fatty acids such as linolenic and linoleic acids are susceptible to formation of hydroperoxides upon contact with oxygen in air. Hydroperoxides are highly reactive functional groups since they contain an oxidant (O-O bond) adjacent to a reductant (C-H bonds). When flanked by olefins, the hydroperoxides can be induced to rearrange to give the hemiacetal. It is this reaction that is catalyzed by hydroperoxide lyases. The resulting aldehydes are notable as fragrances, green leaf volatiles, and antifeedants.

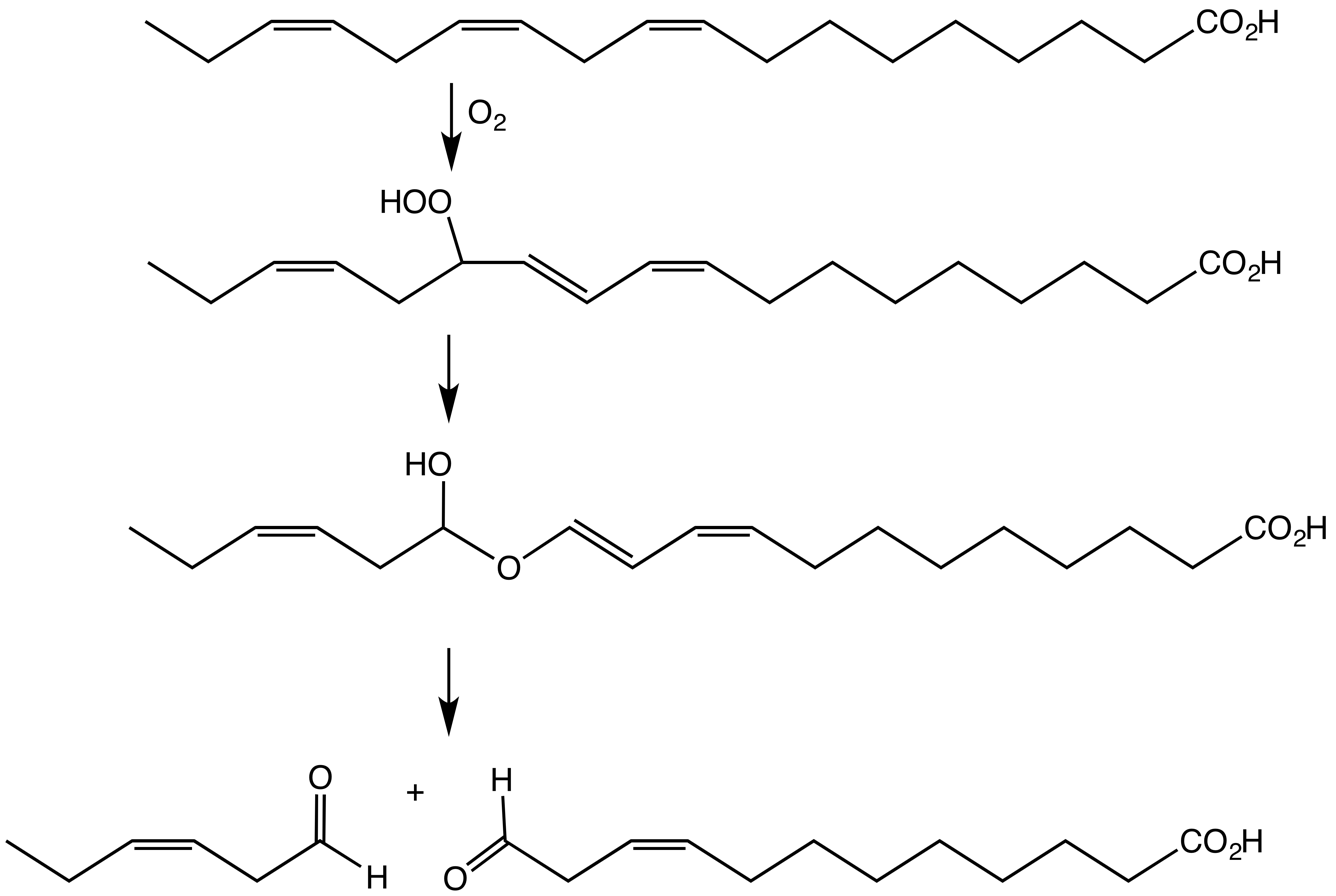
An illustrative transformation involving a hydroperoxide lyase. Here cis-3-hexenal is generated by conversion of linolenic acid to the hydroperoxide by the action of a lipoxygenase followed by the lyase-induced formation of the hemiacetal.
