= Kethoxal =

Names
- IUPAC name 3-Ethoxy-1,1-dihydroxy-2-butanone
- Other names 3-Ethoxy-2-oxobutyraldehyde hydrate

Identifiers
CAS Number	27762-78-3; 3688-37-7 (anhydrous)
3D model (JSmol)	Interactive image
ChEBI	CHEBI:59052
ChemSpider	31346
ECHA InfoCard	100.215.334
KEGG	D04651
MeSH	C005135
PubChem CID	34006
UNII	E00MDP82S4; 2HAV7G194P (anhydrous)
CompTox Dashboard (EPA)	DTXSID90950449
- InChI: InChI=1S/C6H12O4/c1-3-10-4(2)5(7)6(8)9/h4,6,8-9H,3H2,1-2H3 Key: YRCRRHNVYVFNTM-UHFFFAOYSA-N
- SMILES: CCOC(C)C(=O)C(O)O

Properties
Chemical formula	C_{6}H_{12}O_{4}
Molar mass	148.158 g·mol^{−1}
Appearance	Pale yellow syrup
Boiling point	145 °C (293 °F; 418 K)
- Except where otherwise noted, data are given for materials in their standard state (at 25 °C [77 °F], 100 kPa). Infobox references

Kethoxal (3-ethoxy-1,1-dihydroxy-2-butanone) is an organic compound that has antiviral and anaplasmosis properties. It also forms a stable covalent adduct with guanine, which makes it useful for nucleic acid structure determination.

== Nucleic acid binding ==
Kethoxal, as with other 1,2-dicarbonyl compounds, reacts with nucleic acids. It has high specificity for guanine over other ribonucleotides. In whole RNA, it reacts preferentially with guanine residues that are not involved in hydrogen-bonding. It can thus be used to probe the interactions involved with the secondary structure and other binding interactions of RNA and help with nucleic acid sequence analysis. The binding is reversible, which allows the kethoxal to be removed and the original RNA recovered.
