= Nicocortonide =

Chemical compound

Clinical data
- Other names: 11β,14α,17α,21-Tetrahydroxypregn-4-ene-3,20-dione cyclic 14,17-acetal with crotonaldehyde, 21-isonicotinate; 11β,21-Dihydroxy-14α,17α-(1-propenylmethylendioxy)pregn-4-ene-3,20-dione 21-isonicotinate
- Drug class: Corticosteroid; Glucocorticoid

Identifiers
- IUPAC name: 2-{(1R,2R,10R,11S,12S,14S,15R)-12-Hydroxy-10,14-dimethyl-7-oxo-17-[(1Z)-1-propen-1-yl]-16,18-dioxapentacyclo[13.3.2.01,14.02,11.05,10]icos-5-en-15-yl}-2-oxoethyl isonicotinate
- CAS Number: 65415-41-0
- PubChem CID: 70687284
- ChemSpider: 4940815
- UNII: 341BNG318Y
- ChEMBL: ChEMBL2106447
- ECHA InfoCard: 100.059.759

Chemical and physical data
- Formula: C_{31}H_{37}NO_{7}
- Molar mass: 535.637 g·mol^{−1}
- 3D model (JSmol): Interactive image
- SMILES: C/C=C/C1O[C@@]23CC[C@]([C@]2(C[C@@H]([C@H]4[C@H]3CCC5=CC(=O)CC[C@]45C)O)C)(O1)C(=O)COC(=O)C6=CN=CC=C6
- InChI: InChI=1S/C31H37NO7/c1-4-6-25-38-30-12-13-31(39-25,24(35)18-37-27(36)19-7-5-14-32-17-19)29(30,3)16-23(34)26-22(30)9-8-20-15-21(33)10-11-28(20,26)2/h4-7,14-15,17,22-23,25-26,34H,8-13,16,18H2,1-3H3/b6-4+/t22-,23+,25?,26-,28+,29+,30-,31+/m1/s1; Key:NAXHODQTSUXYNT-VOHINOEZSA-N

Nicocortonide is a synthetic glucocorticoid corticosteroid which was never marketed.

== See also ==
- Proligestone
