= Filbertone =

Names
- IUPAC name (2E)-5-Methyl-2-hepten-4-one

Identifiers
CAS Number	102322-83-8; 135910-94-0 (R); 122440-59-9 (S)
3D model (JSmol)	Interactive image
ChemSpider	4515100
ECHA InfoCard	100.133.148
PubChem CID	5362588
UNII	8K2S58736F; F91628PI7J (R); Z91CSH86RZ (S)
CompTox Dashboard (EPA)	DTXSID401017670
- InChI: InChI=1S/C8H14O/c1-4-6-8(9)7(3)5-2/h4,6-7H,5H2,1-3H3/b6-4+ Key: ARJWAURHQDJJAC-GQCTYLIASA-N; InChI=1/C8H14O/c1-4-6-8(9)7(3)5-2/h4,6-7H,5H2,1-3H3/b6-4+ Key: ARJWAURHQDJJAC-GQCTYLIABX
- SMILES: O=C(/C=C/C)C(C)CC

Properties
Chemical formula	C_{8}H_{14}O
Molar mass	126.199 g·mol^{−1}
- Except where otherwise noted, data are given for materials in their standard state (at 25 °C [77 °F], 100 kPa). Infobox references

Filbertone is the principal flavor compound of hazelnuts. It is used in perfumery and is designated as generally recognized as safe (GRAS) for use in food products.

Because filbertone is found in hazelnut oil, its presence can be used to detect the adulteration of olive oil with less expensive hazelnut oil.

The natural compound is a mixture of both enantiomers, and its composition can vary depending on the source. Whilst the aroma of the racemate is described as "hazelnut, nutty", the dextro enantiomer (+)-(E,S)-filbertone is described as "hazelnut, metallic, fatty, nutty" and the laevo enantiomer (-)-(E,R)-filbertone is "hazelnut, soft, buttery, chocolate, metallic, nutty".

== See also ==
- 2-Octanone
- 3-Octanone
