= 3,4-Epoxycyclohexylmethyl-3',4'-epoxycyclohexane carboxylate =

Names
- Preferred IUPAC name (7-Oxabicyclo[4.1.0]heptan-3-yl)methyl 7-oxabicyclo[4.1.0]heptane-3-carboxylate
- Other names 7-Oxabicyclo[4.1.0]hept-3-ylmethyl-7-oxabicyclo[4.1.0]heptane-3-carboxylate

Identifiers
| CAS Number | 2386-87-0 |
| 3D model (JSmol) | Interactive image |
| Abbreviations | ECC |
| ChemSpider | 16058 |
| ECHA InfoCard | 100.017.463 |
| EC Number | 219-207-4 |
| PubChem CID | 16949 |
| UNII | S224DEL3P4 |
| CompTox Dashboard (EPA) | DTXSID901022288 DTXSID2027466, DTXSID901022288 |
- InChI: InChI=1S/C14H20O4/c15-14(9-2-4-11-13(6-9)18-11)16-7-8-1-3-10-12(5-8)17-10/h8-13H,1-7H2 Key: YXALYBMHAYZKAP-UHFFFAOYSA-N
- SMILES: C1CC2C(O2)CC1COC(=O)C3CCC4C(C3)O4

Properties
| Chemical formula | C_{14}H_{20}O_{4} |
| Molar mass | 252.310 g·mol^{−1} |
| Appearance | Colorless liquid |
| Density | 1.17 g·cm^{−3} |
| Melting point | −37 °C (−35 °F; 236 K) |
| Solubility in water | Slightly soluble (13.85 g·l^{−1} (20 °C)) |
- Except where otherwise noted, data are given for materials in their standard state (at 25 °C [77 °F], 100 kPa). Infobox references

3,4-Epoxycyclohexylmethyl-3',4'-epoxycyclohexane carboxylate (ECC) is a cycloaliphatic epoxy resin which is used in many industrial applications. It reacts by cationic polymerization using thermolatent photoinitiators to form crosslinked insoluble thermosets. Formulations based on cycloaliphatic epoxy resins such as ECC are known to form by curing thermosets with high heat and chemical resistance and good adhesion.

== History ==
The homopolymerization of ECC is based on radiation curing, which proceeds via a photochemical formation of a super acid and subsequent cationic polymerization. This was the first time realized in the 1970s.

== Fabrication ==
ECC can be prepared via Tishchenko reaction of tetrahydrobenzaldehyde and subsequent epoxidation with a peracid.

== Properties ==
ECC has a dynamic viscosity of 400 mPa·s at 25 °C.

== Reactivity ==
For homopolymerization of ECC 1.5 to 3 wt. % of an initiator are added. Above 3 wt% initiator no further acceleration was found, increasing proportions of initiators, however, increase the brittleness of the formed thermoset. After a photopolymerization usually still a thermal post-curing is necessary for a complete reaction.

It is known that the reactivity of the monomer is lower than it could be, since the contained ester group can react with the reactive, polymerizing chain end and stabilize it. It therefore reacts significantly slower than other molecules without ester group. ECC polymerizes also much slower than radical monomers. It is therefore the object of research to find cationic polymerizable monomers with higher polymerization rate but same performance.

== Crosslinking ==
Cationically crosslinked ECC is used in a variety of industrial applications, due to its low viscosity, excellent electrical properties and high reliability among others as an electrical insulator, as coating and adhesive or as printing ink. Homopolymerized ECC, however, is extremely brittle, which is disadvantageous. This problem can be addressed by integration of elastomer particles in the epoxy matrix, such as rubber or silicone, by integration of inorganic fillers or by plasticization due to polymerization in the presence of polyester polyols. The latter are covalently integrated via the monomer-activated mechanism into the polymer network.

== Literature ==
- Ellis, Bryan, ed. (2007). Polymers : a property database (2nd ed.). Boca Raton, Fla.: CRC. p. 150. ISBN 978-0-8493-3940-0.
