= 3-Octanone =

Names
- Preferred IUPAC name Octan-3-one
- Other names Ethyl amyl ketone; n-Octanone-3; Amyl ethyl ketone; Ethyl pentyl ketone; Ethyl n-amyl ketone; Ethyl n-pentyl ketone

Identifiers
CAS Number	106-68-3
3D model (JSmol)	Interactive image
ChEBI	CHEBI:80946
ChEMBL	ChEMBL2269087
ChemSpider	215929
ECHA InfoCard	100.003.113
EC Number	203-423-0
KEGG	C17145
PubChem CID	246728
UNII	79173B4107
UN number	2271
CompTox Dashboard (EPA)	DTXSID3041954
- InChI: InChI=1S/C8H16O/c1-3-5-6-7-8(9)4-2/h3-7H2,1-2H3 Key: RHLVCLIPMVJYKS-UHFFFAOYSA-N; InChI=1/C8H16O/c1-3-5-6-7-8(9)4-2/h3-7H2,1-2H3 Key: RHLVCLIPMVJYKS-UHFFFAOYAV
- SMILES: CCCCCC(=O)CC

Properties
Chemical formula	C_{8}H_{16}O
Molar mass	128.215 g·mol^{−1}
Appearance	colorless liquid
Density	0.822 g/mL
Boiling point	167 to 168 °C (333 to 334 °F; 440 to 441 K)
Solubility in water	insoluble in water
Vapor pressure	2 mmHg (20°C)

Hazards
Flash point	59 °C; 138 °F; 332 K
- NIOSH (US health exposure limits)
PEL (Permissible)	TWA 25 ppm (130 mg/m^{3})
- Except where otherwise noted, data are given for materials in their standard state (at 25 °C [77 °F], 100 kPa). Infobox references

3-Octanone is an organic compound with the formula C_{5}H_{11}C(O)C_{2}H_{5}. A colorless fragrant liquid, it is classified as a ketone. It is one of three octanones, the others being 2-octanone and 4-octanone.

== Occurrence ==
3-Octanone is found in a variety of sources such as plants (such as lavender), herbs (such as rosemary, basil, and thyme), and nectarines. It was also found to be present in Japanese catnip (Schizonepeta tenuifolia) and the pine king bolete (Boletus pinophilus). It is produced by oyster mushrooms as an nematicide to kill roundworms.

== Uses ==
3-Octanone is used as a flavor and fragrance ingredient.

== See also ==
- Filbertone
