= 2,2,5,5-Tetramethyltetrahydrofuran =

Names
- Preferred IUPAC name 2,2,5,5-Tetramethyloxolane
- Other names TMO, Tetrahydro-2,2,5,5-tetramethylfuran, TMTHF, Me4THF

Identifiers
| CAS Number | 15045-43-9 |
| 3D model (JSmol) | Interactive image |
| ChemSpider | 25151 |
| ECHA InfoCard | 100.035.547 |
| EC Number | 239-117-9 |
| PubChem CID | 27010 |
| UNII | 83Z08D4U0T |
| CompTox Dashboard (EPA) | DTXSID1022263 |
- InChI: InChI=1S/C8H16O/c1-7(2)5-6-8(3,4)9-7/h5-6H2,1-4H3 Key: BBLDTXFLAHKYFJ-UHFFFAOYSA-N
- SMILES: CC1(CCC(O1)(C)C)C

Properties
| Chemical formula | C_{8}H_{16}O |
| Molar mass | 128.21 |
| Appearance | clear colorless |
| Density | 0.811 g/cm^{3} (25 C) |
| Melting point | −92 °C (−134 °F; 181 K) |
| Boiling point | 112 °C (234 °F; 385 K) |
| Solubility in water | water: 1627 mg/L at 25 C |
| log P | 2.39 |
| Refractive index (n_{D}) | 1.405 |

Hazards
- Occupational safety and health (OHS/OSH)
| Main hazards | highly flammable |
| Flash point | 4 °C; 39 °F; 277 K |
- Except where otherwise noted, data are given for materials in their standard state (at 25 °C [77 °F], 100 kPa). Infobox references

2,2,5,5-tetramethyltetrahydrofuran (TMTHF) or 2,2,5,5-tetramethyloxolane (TMO) is a heterocyclic compound with the formula C_{8}H_{16}O, or (CH_{3})_{2}(C(CH_{2})_{2}OC)(CH_{3})_{2}. It can be seen as derivative of tetrahydrofuran (oxolane) with four methyl groups replacing four hydrogen atoms on each of the carbon atoms in the ring that are adjacent to the oxygen. The absence of hydrogen atoms adjacent to the oxygen means that TMTHF (TMO) does not form peroxides, unlike other common ethers such as tetrahydrofuran, diethyl ether and CPME.

The compound has been demonstrated as a non-polar solvent in research chemistry, having similar properties to toluene and as a reagent in chemical synthesis.

== Natural occurrence ==
The compound is produced in small quantities by the mycelium of Tuber borchii, a mushroom similar to the truffle.

== Synthesis and chemistry ==
The compound is easily prepared by the ring closure of 2,5-dimethylhexane-2,5-diol using acid catalysts. Zeolites have been shown to be particularly high yielding but sulfuric acid can also be used.

TMTHF reacts with benzene in the presence of triflic acid to form 1,1,4,4-dimethyltetralin and symmetric tetramethyloctahydroanthracene. This and other similar reactions can be used for the selective preparation of derivatives of naphthalene, anthracene, and tetracene, and other fused-ring aromatic hydrocarbons.

TMTHF undergoes photolysis by UV; in aqueous solution, the products are mainly methane, ethane, and 2-hydroxy-2,5,5-trimethyltetrahydrofuran. The dehydration of TMTHF yields alkenes like 2,5-dimethyl-2,4-hexadiene and 2,5-dimethyl-1,5-hexadiene.

Reaction with fluorine substitutes it for all hydrogen atoms to yield perfluoro(2,2,5,5-tetramethyltetrahydrofuran) C_{8}F_{16}O (bp 99 C, mp −31 °C).

== See also ==
- 2,5-Dimethylfuran
- 3,3,4,4-Tetramethyltetrahydrofuran
