= 2-Octanone =

Names
- Preferred IUPAC name Octan-2-one

Identifiers
CAS Number	111-13-7
3D model (JSmol)	Interactive image
ChEBI	CHEBI:87434
ChEMBL	ChEMBL18549
ChemSpider	7802
ECHA InfoCard	100.003.489
EC Number	203-837-1
PubChem CID	8093
UNII	J2G84H29AF
CompTox Dashboard (EPA)	DTXSID4021927
- InChI: InChI=1S/C8H16O/c1-3-4-5-6-7-8(2)9/h3-7H2,1-2H3 Key: ZPVFWPFBNIEHGJ-UHFFFAOYSA-N
- SMILES: CCCCCCC(=O)C

Properties
Chemical formula	C_{8}H_{16}O
Molar mass	128.215 g·mol^{−1}
Appearance	colorless liquid
Density	0.820 g/cm^{3} (20 °C)
Melting point	−16 °C (3 °F; 257 K)
Boiling point	172–173 °C (342–343 °F; 445–446 K)

Hazards
- GHS labelling
Pictograms	(GHS02: Flammable)
Signal word	Warning
Hazard statements	H226
Precautionary statements	P210, P233, P240, P241, P242, P243, P280, P303+P361+P353, P370+P378, P403+P235, P501
- Except where otherwise noted, data are given for materials in their standard state (at 25 °C [77 °F], 100 kPa). Infobox references

2-Octanone is an organic compound with the formula CH_{3}C(O)C_{6}H_{13}. It is a colorless volatile liquid that is produced commercially for use in the fragrance industry. It is produced by the condensation of acetone and pentanal followed by hydrogenation of the alkene. It can also be produced by selective oxidation of 1-octene. It is one of three octanones, the others being 3-octanone and 4-octanone. It is a common if trace component of many cooked foods.

== See also ==
- Filbertone
