= 3,3,4,4-Tetramethyltetrahydrofuran =

Names
- Preferred IUPAC name 3,3,4,4-Tetramethyloxolane
- Other names Tetrahydro-3,3,4,4-tetramethylfuran

Identifiers
CAS Number	32970-38-0
3D model (JSmol)	Interactive image
ChemSpider	19257161
PubChem CID	21354952
UNII	3T5WU2DJ8X
CompTox Dashboard (EPA)	DTXSID901295013
- InChI: InChI=1S/C8H16O/c1-7(2)5-9-6-8(7,3)4/h5-6H2,1-4H3 Key: DAQZHQHZMPVCQW-UHFFFAOYSA-N
- SMILES: CC1(C)COCC1(C)C

Properties
Chemical formula	C_{8}H_{16}O
Molar mass	128.21
Appearance	white crystalline
Melting point	106–107 °C
- Except where otherwise noted, data are given for materials in their standard state (at 25 °C [77 °F], 100 kPa). Infobox references

In chemistry, 3,3,4,4-tetramethyltetrahydrofuran or 3,3,4,4-tetramethyloxolane is a heterocyclic compound with the formula C_{8}H_{16}O, or (CH_{3})_{2}((CH_{2})C_{2(CH_{2})}O)(CH_{3})_{2}. It can be seen as derivative of tetrahydrofuran (oxolane) with two methyl groups replacing two hydrogen atoms on each of the carbon atoms in the ring that are not adjacent to the oxygen. It can be seen also as a cyclic ether of 2,2,3,3-tetramethylbutane, an isomer of octane.

== Synthesis and chemistry ==
The compound can be prepared by heating 2,2,3,3-Tetramethylbutane-1,4-diol in dimethylsulfoxide at 160 °C. The compound is decomposed by butyllithium with cleavage of the ring, and this reaction has been considered as a way of obtaining lithium enolates of aldehydes.

In a superacid solution (SbF_{5}-HSO_{3}F-SO_{2}), the oxygen atom is protonated, and the carbon chain is split at the 3-4 bond, which gets replaced by bonds from carbons 3 and 4 to the oxygen atom. The formula of the resulting species could be written as (–(CH_{3})_{2}C-CH_{2}–)_{2}O^{+}H.

== See also ==
- 3,4-Dimethylfuran
- 2,2,5,5-Tetramethyltetrahydrofuran
- 3,3,4,4-Tetramethyltetrahydrofuran-2,5-dione
