= List of compounds with carbon number 3 =

This is a partial list of molecules that contain 3 carbon atoms.

Chemical formula	Synonyms	CAS number
C_{3}Al_{4}	aluminium carbide	1299-86-1
C_{3}BrF_{7}	heptafluoropropyl bromide	422-85-5
C_{3}BrN	bromocyanoacetylene	3114-46-3
C_{3}ClF_{5}O	chloropentafluoroacetone	79-53-8
C_{3}ClF_{5}O	pentafluoropropionyl chloride	422-59-3
C_{3}ClN	chlorocyanoacetylene	2003-31-8
C_{3}Cl_{3}NO_{2}	trichloroacetyl isocyanate	3019-71-4
C_{3}Cl_{3}N_{3}	cyanuric chloride	108-77-0
C_{3}Cl_{3}N_{3}O_{3}	trichloroisocyanuric acid	87-90-1
C_{3}Cl_{5}FO	fluoropentachloroacetone	2378-08-7
C_{3}Cl_{6}	hexachlorocyclopropane	2065-35-2
C_{3}CoNO_{4}	cobalt tricarbonyl nitrosyl	14096-82-3
C_{3}Cr_{7}	chromium carbide	12075-40-0
C_{3}F_{4}	perfluoroallene	461-68-7
C_{3}F_{6}O	pentafluoropropionyl fluoride	422-61-7
C_{3}HCl_{2}N_{3}O_{3}	dichloroisocyanuric acid	2782-57-2
C_{3}HCl_{3}O_{2}	trichloroacrylic acid	2257-35-4
C_{3}HF_{5}O_{2}	pentafluoropropionic acid	422-64-0
C_{3}HF_{6}N	hexafluoroacetone imine	1645-75-6
C_{3}HN	isocyanoacetylene	66723-45-3
C_{3}HN	propiolonitrile	1070-71-9
C_{3}HNO	cyanoketene	4452-08-8
C_{3}H_{2}	cyclopropenylidene	16165-40-5
C_{3}H_{2}	propadienylidene	60731-10-4
C_{3}H_{2}ClF_{5}O	enflurane	13838-16-9
C_{3}H_{2}ClNO_{2}	chloroacetyl isocyanate	4461-30-7
C_{3}H_{2}Cl_{2}O_{2}	malonyl dichloride	1663-67-8
C_{3}H_{2}F_{5}NO	pentafluoropropionamide	354-76-7
C_{3}H_{2}N_{2}	malononitrile	109-77-3
C_{3}H_{2}O	propadienal	61244-93-7
C_{3}H_{2}O_{2}	propiolic acid	471-25-0
C_{3}H_{3}	cyclopropenyl radical	28933-84-8
C_{3}H_{3}	propargyl radical	2932-78-7
C_{3}H_{3}Br_{3}O_{2}	methyl tribromoacetate	3222-05-7
C_{3}H_{3}ClO_{3}	methyl oxalyl chloride	5781-53-3
C_{3}H_{3}F_{3}N_{2}O_{2}	trifluoroacetylurea	760-41-8
C_{3}H_{3}F_{5}O	methyl pentafluoroethyl ether	22410-44-2
C_{3}H_{3}NO	acetyl cyanide	631-57-2
C_{3}H_{3}NO	isoxazole	288-14-2
C_{3}H_{3}NO	oxazole	288-42-6
C_{3}H_{3}NO	propiolamide	7341-96-0
C_{3}H_{3}NS	isothiazole	288-16-4
C_{3}H_{3}NS	thiazole	288-47-1
C_{3}H_{3}O	propenoyl radical	72241-20-4
C_{3}H_{4}	cyclopropene	2781-85-3
C_{3}H_{4}	propyne	74-99-7
C_{3}H_{4}BrClO_{2}	methyl bromochloroacetate	20428-74-4
C_{3}H_{4}Cl_{2}F_{2}O	methoxyflurane	76-38-0
C_{3}H_{4}F_{2}O_{2}	methyl difluoroacetate	433-53-4
C_{3}H_{4}N_{2}	methyleneaminoacetonitrile	109-82-0
C_{3}H_{4}O	cyclopropanone	5009-27-8
C_{3}H_{4}O	methoxyacetylene	6443-91-0
C_{3}H_{4}O	methylketene	6004-44-0
C_{3}H_{4}O_{2}	glycidaldehyde	765-34-4
C_{3}H_{4}O_{2}	propanedial	542-78-9
C_{3}H_{4}O_{3}	ethylene carbonate	96-49-1
C_{3}H_{4}O_{3}	methyl glyoxylate	922-68-9
C_{3}H_{4}O_{3}	pyruvic acid	127-17-3
C_{3}H_{4}O_{3}	tartronaldehyde	497-15-4
C_{3}H_{4}O_{4}	malonic acid	141-82-2
C_{3}H_{4}O_{5}	tartronic acid	80-69-3
C_{3}H_{4}S	methylthioacetylene	10152-75-7
C_{3}H_{4}S	thioacrolein	53439-64-8
C_{3}H_{5}	allyl radical	1981-80-2
C_{3}H_{5}	cyclopropyl radical	2417-82-5
C_{3}H_{5}Br	cyclopropyl bromide	4333-56-6
C_{3}H_{5}BrO	propionyl bromide	598-22-1
C_{3}H_{5}ClN_{2}	imidazole hydrochloride	1467-16-9
C_{3}H_{5}ClO	epichlorohydrin	13403-37-7
C_{3}H_{5}ClO	propanoyl chloride	79-03-8
C_{3}H_{5}ClO_{2}	chloromethyl ethanoate	625-56-9
C_{3}H_{5}ClO_{2}	methoxyacetyl chloride	38870-89-2
C_{3}H_{5}Cl_{2}OP	allylphosphonic dichloride	1498-47-1
C_{3}H_{5}CsO_{2}	caesium propionate	38869-24-8
C_{3}H_{5}FO	propionyl fluoride	430-71-7
C_{3}H_{5}FO_{2}	methyl fluoroacetate	453-18-9
C_{3}H_{5}KO_{2}	potassium propionate	327-62-8
C_{3}H_{5}LiO_{2}	lithium propionate	6531-45-9
C_{3}H_{5}N	cyclopropanimine	54376-32-8
C_{3}H_{5}N	propanenitrile	107-12-0
C_{3}H_{5}N	propargylamine	2450-71-7
C_{3}H_{5}N	vinylimine	18295-52-8
C_{3}H_{5}NO	acrylamide	79-06-1
C_{3}H_{5}NO	methoxyacetonitrile	1738-36-9
C_{3}H_{5}NOS	methoxymethyl isothiocyanate	19900-84-6
C_{3}H_{5}NO_{2}S	methanesulfonylacetonitrile	2274-42-2
C_{3}H_{5}NO_{3}	nitroacetone	10230-68-9
C_{3}H_{5}N_{3}O_{3}	glyoxylic acid semicarbazone	928-73-4
C_{3}H_{5}N_{3}O_{9}	nitroglycerin	55-63-0
C_{3}H_{5}NaO_{2}	sodium propanoate	137-40-6
C_{3}H_{5}O	propionyl radical	15843-24-0
C_{3}H_{5}O_{2}Rb	rubidium propionate	19559-54-7
C_{3}H_{5}O_{2}Tl	thallium propionate	63424-48-6
C_{3}H_{6}	cyclopropane	75-19-4
C_{3}H_{6}	propene	115-07-1
C_{3}H_{6}BrNO_{4}	bronopol	52-51-7
C_{3}H_{6}Cl_{2}Si	dichloromethylvinylsilane	124-70-9
C_{3}H_{6}N_{2}O_{2}	cycloserine	68-41-7
C_{3}H_{6}N_{2}O_{2}	propanediamide	108-13-4
C_{3}H_{6}N_{2}S	ethenylthiourea	1483-58-5
C_{3}H_{6}O	acetone	67-64-1
C_{3}H_{6}O	cyclopropanol	16545-68-9
C_{3}H_{6}O	oxetane	503-30-0
C_{3}H_{6}O	propanal	123-38-6
C_{3}H_{6}O	propylene oxide	75-56-9
C_{3}H_{6}OS	ethyl thioformate	21071-39-6
C_{3}H_{6}OSe	methylselenoacetate	209530-82-5
C_{3}H_{6}O_{2}	glycidol	556-52-5
C_{3}H_{6}O_{2}	propanoic acid	79-09-4
C_{3}H_{6}O_{2}	Hydroxyacetone	116-09-6
C_{3}H_{6}O_{3}	lactic acid	598-82-3
C_{3}H_{6}O_{3}	methoxymethyl formate	4382-75-6
C_{3}H_{6}O_{3}	methylene glycol monoacetate	86011-33-8
C_{3}H_{6}O_{3}	methylglyoxal hydrate	1186-47-6
C_{3}H_{6}S	allyl mercaptan	870-23-5
C_{3}H_{6}S	methyl vinyl sulfide	1822-74-8
C_{3}H_{6}S	thietane	287-27-4
C_{3}H_{6}S	thioacetone	4756-05-2
C_{3}H_{6}S_{2}	methyl dithioacetate	2168-84-5
C_{3}H_{7}	isopropyl radical	2025-55-0
C_{3}H_{7}BF_{2}	isopropyldifluoroborane	3857-03-2
C_{3}H_{7}BrHg	isopropryl mercuric bromide	18819-83-5
C_{3}H_{7}ClHg	chloropropylmercury	2440-40-6
C_{3}H_{7}ClHg	isopropyl mercuric chloride	30615-19-1
C_{3}H_{7}ClN_{6}	melamine hydrochloride	626-32-4
C_{3}H_{7}Cl_{2}P	dichloropropylphosphine	15573-31-6
C_{3}H_{7}Cl_{3}Si	dichloromethylmethyldichlorosilane	18171-56-7
C_{3}H_{7}HgI	isopropyl mercuric iodide	38455-14-0
C_{3}H_{7}N	azetidine	503-29-7
C_{3}H_{7}N	cyclopropylamine	765-30-0
C_{3}H_{7}NO	isoxazolidine	504-72-3
C_{3}H_{7}NO	propanamide	79-05-0
C_{3}H_{7}NO_{2}	alanine	56-41-7
C_{3}H_{7}NO_{2}	nitropropane	25322-01-4
C_{3}H_{7}NO_{2}	propyl nitrite	543-67-9
C_{3}H_{7}NO_{2}	sarcosine	107-97-1
C_{3}H_{7}NO_{2}	urethane	51-79-6
C_{3}H_{7}NO_{3}	isoserine	632-12-2
C_{3}H_{7}S	propylthio radical	4985-58-4
C_{3}H_{8}	propane	74-98-6
C_{3}H_{8}Cl_{2}Si	dichloroethylmethylsilane	4525-44-4
C_{3}H_{8}FO_{2}P	ethyl methylphosphonofluoridate	673-97-2
C_{3}H_{8}FO_{2}P	methyl ethylphosphonofluoridate	665-03-2
C_{3}H_{8}N_{2}	pyrazolidine	504-70-1
C_{3}H_{8}N_{2}O_{3}	dimethanolurea	140-95-4
C_{3}H_{8}N_{4}O_{2}	propanedioyl dihydrazide	3815-86-9
C_{3}H_{8}O	isopropyl alcohol	67-63-0
C_{3}H_{8}OS_{2}	dimercaprol	59-52-9
C_{3}H_{8}O_{2}	propylene glycol	57-55-6
C_{3}H_{8}O_{2}	propylhydroperoxide	6068-96-8
C_{3}H_{8}O_{2}S	ethanesulfinic acid methyl ester	31401-21-5
C_{3}H_{8}O_{2}S	monothioglycerol	96-27-5
C_{3}H_{8}O_{3}S	sulfurous acid ethyl methyl ester	10315-59-0
C_{3}H_{8}S_{2}	2,4-dithiapentane	1618-26-4
C_{3}H_{8}S_{2}	methyl ethyl disulfide	20333-39-5
C_{3}H_{8}Si	silacyclobutane	287-29-6
C_{3}H_{9}Al	trimethylaluminium	75-24-1
C_{3}H_{9}AsS	dimethyl methylthioarsine	38859-90-4
C_{3}H_{9}AsSe	dimethyl methylselenoarsine	73076-88-7
C_{3}H_{9}BF_{3}N	trimethylaminetrifluoroborane	420-20-2
C_{3}H_{9}BS_{3}	trimethyl trithioborate	997-49-9
C_{3}H_{9}BrGe	bromotrimethylgermane	1066-37-1
C_{3}H_{9}BrPb	trimethyl lead bromide	6148-48-7
C_{3}H_{9}BrSi	bromotrimethylsilane	2857-97-8
C_{3}H_{9}BrSn	trimethyltin bromide	1066-44-0
C_{3}H_{9}Br_{2}Sb	trimethylantimony dibromide	24606-08-4
C_{3}H_{9}ClFSb	chlorofluorotrimethylantimony	13077-54-8
C_{3}H_{9}ClGe	trimethylgermanium chloride	1529-47-1
C_{3}H_{9}ClPb	trimethyllead chloride	1520-78-1
C_{3}H_{9}Cl_{2}Sb	trimethylantimony dichloride	13059-67-1
C_{3}H_{9}FGe	trimethylgermyl fluoride	661-37-0
C_{3}H_{9}Ga	gallium trimethyl	1445-79-0
C_{3}H_{9}ISi	iodotrimethylsilane	16029-98-4
C_{3}H_{9}I_{2}Sb	trimethylantimony diiodide	13077-53-7
C_{3}H_{9}In	trimethylindium	3385-78-2
C_{3}H_{9}N	ethylmethylamine	624-78-2
C_{3}H_{9}N	isopropylamine	75-31-0
C_{3}H_{9}N	propylamine	107-10-8
C_{3}H_{9}N	trimethylamine	75-50-3
C_{3}H_{9}NO	N-Methylethanolamine	109-83-1
C_{3}H_{9}NO	dimethylaminomethanol	14002-21-2
C_{3}H_{9}NO	trimethylhydroxylamine	5669-39-6
C_{3}H_{9}N_{3}OS	cysteine hydrazide	70470-68-7
C_{3}H_{9}N_{3}Si	azidotrimethylsilane	4648-54-8
C_{3}H_{9}N_{9}	cyanuric trihydrazide	10105-42-7
C_{3}H_{9}OP	trimethylphosphine oxide	676-96-0
C_{3}H_{9}PS	dimethyl methylthiophosphine	35449-60-6
C_{3}H_{9}PS	trimethylphosphine sulfide	2404-55-9
C_{3}H_{9}PSe	dimethyl methylselenophosphine	24490-39-9
C_{3}H_{9}P_{2}	trimethyldiphosphinyl radical	89148-95-8
C_{3}H_{9}Si	trimethylsilyl radical	16571-41-8
C_{3}H_{9}Sn	trimethyltin	17272-57-0
C_{3}H_{9}Tl	trimethyl thallium	3003-15-4
C_{3}H_{10}CdCl_{3}N	trimethylammonium trichlorocadmate	68778-49-4
C_{3}H_{10}Ge	trimethylgermane	1449-63-4
C_{3}H_{10}N_{2}	1,3-Diaminopropane	109-76-2
C_{3}H_{10}N_{2}O_{3}	isopropylamine nitrate	87478-71-5
C_{3}H_{10}O_{3}Si	trimethoxysilane	2487-90-3
C_{3}H_{10}Si	isopropylsilane	18230-84-7
C_{3}H_{12}CdCl_{4}N_{2}	propyldiammonium cadmium tetrachloride	60970-45-8
C_{3}H_{12}Cl_{4}MnN_{2}	propyldiammonium manganese tetrachloride	59683-18-0
C_{3}H_{12}N_{6}O_{3}	guanidine carbonate	593-85-1
C_{3}IN	iodocyanoacetylene	2003-32-9
C_{3}La	lanthanum tricarbide	12602-63-0
C_{3}Mg_{2}	magnesium carbide	12151-74-5
C_{3}N	cyanoethynyl radical	12543-75-8
C_{3}N_{2}O	oxopropanedinitrile	1115-12-4
C_{3}N_{3}P	tricyanophosphine	1116-01-4
C_{3}O_{2}	carbon suboxide	504-64-3
C_{3}Si_{2}	disilicon tricarbide	12327-32-1
C_{3}Th	thorium tricarbide	69553-67-9

== See also ==
- Carbon number
- List of compounds with carbon number 2
- List of compounds with carbon number 4
