= Lithium propionate =

Names
- Other names Lithium propanoate Propanyllithium; EtCOOLi

Identifiers
CAS Number	6531-45-9
3D model (JSmol)	Interactive image
ChemSpider	2341098
EC Number	229-429-3
PubChem CID	23689528
- InChI: InChI=1S/C3H6O2.Li/c1-2-3(4)5;/h2H2,1H3,(H,4,5);/q;+1/p-1 Key: AXMOZGKEVIBBCF-UHFFFAOYSA-M
- SMILES: [Li+].[O-]C(=O)CC

Properties
Chemical formula	C_{3}H_{5}LiO_{2}
Molar mass	80.01 g·mol^{−1}
Appearance	Transparent crystals
Density	1.254 g/cm^{3}
Melting point	333.0 °C; 631.3 °F; 606.1 K
Solubility in water	1 g/mL
Solubility in ethanol	41.7 g/L

Structure
Crystal structure	Monoclinic
Space group	P2_{1}/c (No. 14)
Lattice constant	a = 9.823 Å, b = 4.9330 Å, c = 8.8120 Å α = 90°, β = 96.86°, γ = 90°
Lattice volume (V)	423.94 Å^{3}
Formula units (Z)	4 units per cell

Thermochemistry
Enthalpy of fusion (Δ_{f}H^{⦵}_{fus})	197-198 kJ/kg

Hazards
- GHS labelling
Pictograms	(GHS07: Exclamation mark) (GHS09: Environmental hazard)
Signal word	Warning
Hazard statements	H315, H411, H412
Precautionary statements	P264, P273, P280, P302+P352, P321, P332+P317, P362+P364, P391, P501
- Except where otherwise noted, data are given for materials in their standard state (at 25 °C [77 °F], 100 kPa). verify (what is ?) Infobox references

Lithium propionate, also known as lithium propanoate, is a lithium salt of propionic acid with the chemical formula CH₃CH₂COOLi. It is the lightest of the metal propionates.

== Structure ==
A solid−solid phase transition occurs, suggesting dimorphism despite the crystal system remaining monoclinic.

== Preparation ==
Lithium propionate can be prepared by treating a basic lithium salt such as lithium carbonate or lithium hydroxide with propionic acid.

== Uses ==
Lithium propionate is used in laboratory research. Like the closely related lithium acetate (LiOAc), lithium propionate is used as a buffer in certain cosmetic products. Lithium propionate has also been investigated in the development of electrodes, where secondary lithium electrodes were introduced in propylene carbonate. In organic synthesis, lithium propionate esters have been used to stereoselectively induce alternating methyl and methoxy moieties in α-β unsaturated esters through a Michael addition reaction.

== Reactions ==
Decomposition takes place via ketonization, yielding the symmetric ketone (3-pentanone) and lithium carbonate:

2Li(O_{2}CEt) → Li_{2}CO_{3} + Et(CO)Et
