= C9H18O =

The molecular formula C_{9}H_{18}O (molar mass: 142.24 g/mol) may refer to:

- Nonanal
- Nonanones
  - 2-Nonanone
  - 3-Nonanone
  - 4-Nonanone
  - 5-Nonanone, or dibutyl ketone
- 3,3,5-Trimethylcyclohexanol
