= Ammonium propionate =

Chemical compound

Names
- IUPAC name Ammonium propanoate
- Other names Ammonium propionate propanoic acid, ammonium salt(1:1)

Identifiers
CAS Number	17496-08-1
3D model (JSmol)	Interactive image
ChemSpider	78604
ECHA InfoCard	100.037.715
EC Number	241-503-7
PubChem CID	87139
UNII	V18VR2SK15
CompTox Dashboard (EPA)	DTXSID9066207
- InChI: InChI=1S/C3H6O2.H3N/c1-2-3(4)5;/h2H2,1H3,(H,4,5);1H3 Key: XJMWHXZUIGHOBA-UHFFFAOYSA-N
- SMILES: CCC(=O)[O-].[NH4+]

Properties
Chemical formula	C_{3}H_{9}NO_{2}
Molar mass	91.110 g·mol^{−1}
Melting point	45 °C (113 °F; 318 K)
Boiling point	141.7 °C (287.1 °F; 414.8 K)
Solubility in water	1 g/mL

Hazards
- Occupational safety and health (OHS/OSH)
Main hazards	Irritant
- GHS labelling
Pictograms	(GHS07: Exclamation mark)
Signal word	Warning
Hazard statements	H315, H319, H335
Precautionary statements	P261, P264, P271, P280, P302+P352, P304+P340, P305+P351+P338, P312, P321, P332+P313, P337+P313, P362, P403+P233, P405, P501
- Except where otherwise noted, data are given for materials in their standard state (at 25 °C [77 °F], 100 kPa). verify (what is ?) Infobox references

Ammonium propionate or ammonium propanoate is the ammonium salt of propionic acid. It has the chemical formula NH_{4}(C_{2}H_{5}COO).

== Reaction ==
It is formed by the reaction of propionic acid and ammonia.

== Uses ==
It is used in several products, which include: fertilizers, water treatment chemicals, and plant protection products. It is also used in different areas, such as: manufacturing, forestry, agriculture, and fishing.

It also serves as an antiseptic, antifungal agent, antimould agent, and preservative in feed industry or food industry.

Ammonium propionate also prevents spoilage of cosmetics by preventing bacterial growth.

== See also ==
- Calcium propionate
- Potassium propionate
- Sodium propionate
