= 4-Ipomeanol =

- 4-Ipomeanol

Names
- Preferred IUPAC name 1-(Furan-3-yl)-4-hydroxypentan-1-one

Identifiers
CAS Number	32954-58-8
3D model (JSmol)	Interactive image
ChemSpider	33367
PubChem CID	36284
UNII	URT1FLO407
CompTox Dashboard (EPA)	DTXSID10866492
- InChI: InChI=1S/C9H12O3/c1-7(10)2-3-9(11)8-4-5-12-6-8/h4-7,10H,2-3H2,1H3; Key: RJYQLMILDVERHH-UHFFFAOYSA-N
- SMILES: CC(CCC(=O)C1=COC=C1)O

Properties
Chemical formula	C_{9}H_{12}O_{3}
Molar mass	168.192 g·mol^{−1}
- Except where otherwise noted, data are given for materials in their standard state (at 25 °C [77 °F], 100 kPa). Infobox references

4-Ipomeanol (4-IPO) is a pulmonary pre-toxin isolated from sweet potatoes infected with the fungus Fusarium solani. One of the 4-IPO metabolites is toxic to the lungs, liver and kidney in humans and animals. This metabolite can covalently bind to proteins, thereby interfering with normal cell processes.

The toxic metabolite, an enedial, is mostly formed in the bronchiolar exocrine cells (club cells) in the lungs of rodents. Necrosis of bronchiolar cells is therefore the primary damaging effect of the toxin, due to this location of metabolism. The secondary pathological effects are edema, congestion and hemorrhage caused by the destruction of the bronchiolar exocrine cells. In humans the metabolite is mostly formed in the liver, and causes liver toxicity.

== Structure and reactivity ==
4-Ipomeanol is a chemical compound belonging to the family of furans. It consists of a furan ring, which is substituted at the third carbon of the furan ring with a pentanone containing a hydroxyl group. A furan ring is a five-membered aromatic ring consisting of one oxygen atom and four carbon atoms; a pentanone is a ketone consisting of five carbon atoms. Other 3-substituted furans are ipomeanine (IPN), 1-ipomeanol (1-IPO) and 1,4-ipomeanol (DIOL), differing in the locations of the hydroxyl groups. 4-IPO has three functional groups which determine the molecule's reactivity. These are the furan ring, the ketone group and the alcohol group.

=== Reactivity of furan ring ===
The furan ring is aromatic according to Hückel’s rule, so the furan makes the compound relatively stable. Therefore, this ring will not react easily with other compounds. Furan is heterocyclic, which means that it is cyclic, but one or more of the ring atoms is not a carbon atom. In the case of furan this heteroatom is an oxygen atom. This atom is sp2 hybridized and has one lone pair in an sp2 orbital and a second lone pair in a p orbital, overlapping with the p orbitals of adjacent carbons. This results in a pi bond formation.

=== Reactivity of ketone ===
A ketone group is polar, as oxygen is more electronegative than carbon. Therefore, the carbonyl atom of the ketone group is electron deficient, thus electrophilic, and can easily react with nucleophiles. However, it does not undergo substitution reactions, as the attached molecule is a too strong base to be eliminated. As a result of this, irreversible nucleophilic addition reactions are possible: a nucleophile can add to the carbonyl carbon, but due to the lack of a good leaving group, no base is eliminated. This intermediate molecule takes up a proton, so a hydroxyl group is formed. When there is sufficient acid present, the hydroxyl group can be protonated further, making it a good leaving group. This functional group will then react as an alcohol group.

As described above is the basic reaction mechanism of ketones. In this way ketones can undergo several organic reactions, reacting with compounds like grignard reagents, acetylide, cyanide, and hydride ions, amines, water, alcohols and peroxyacids.

=== Reactivity of alcohol ===
The alcohol group is a strongly basic leaving group that cannot undergo nucleophilic substitution reactions. However, it becomes a better leaving group after protonation, which converts the leaving group from OH^{−} to H_{2}O. H_{2}O is a weaker base than OH^{−} and can thus undergo substitution reactions with weakly basic nucleophiles. This reaction occurs following a SN2 mechanism, as 4-IPO is a secondary alcohol.

Dehydration of the pentanone substituted alcohol group is also possible, following an E1 reaction mechanism. This reaction is acid-catalyzed and results in the loss of a water molecule. Like with the SN1 reaction, protonation of the leaving group is required first. Water then is eliminated, leaving behind a carbocation, which leads eventually to alkene formation. Furthermore, secondary alcohols can undergo oxidation reactions. This results in the formation of a ketone.

== Synthesis ==
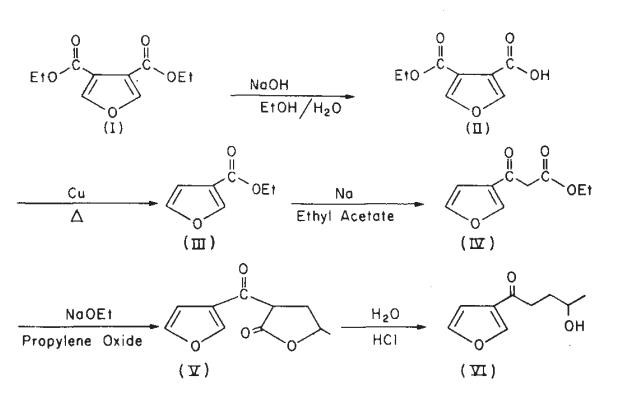
Synthesis of 4-IPO

4-IPO can be isolated from sweet potatoes infected with the fungus Fusarium solani. However, it can also be synthesized from the commercially available chemical diethyl 3,4-furandicarboxylate.

Partial hydrolysis of diethyl 3,4-furandicarboxylate (I) with an equimolar quantity of NaOH results in the monoester 4-(ethoxycarbonyl)furan-3-carboxylic acid (II) occurs. This is followed by decarboxylation by heating with a copper powder yielded ethyl 3-furoate (III). The Claisen condensation is used to form ethyl 3-furoylacetate (IV). By reacting with propylene oxide, lactone (V) is formed. Decarboxylation is achieved by gently heating lactone in the presence of diluted acid (VI).

== Metabolism ==
Metabolic activation of 4-IPO occurs by one of the enzymes of the cytochrome P450 (CYP) superfamily. The oxidation of the furan ring leads to the formation of an unstable epoxide (cyclic ester with a three-atom ring), so an alkylating intermediate species, 4-IPO enedial, is formed.

In rodents it is CYP4B1 that activates 4-IPO [1], an enzyme of the CYP4 family, of which the CYP4B subfamily is involved in the fatty acid metabolism. CYP4B1 is present in high levels in the lungs and its affinity for 4-IPO is greater than for liver CYP enzymes. Therefore, the activated form of 4-IPO is mainly toxic to the lungs in rodents.

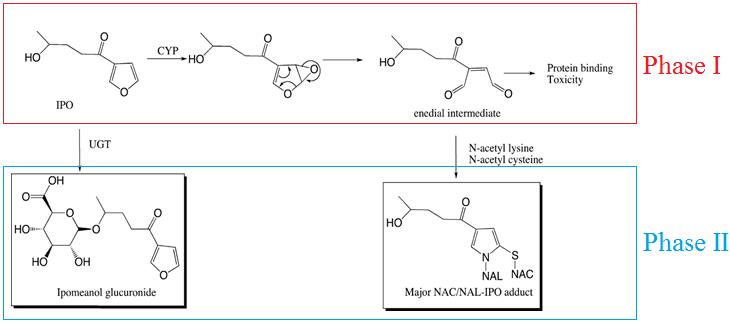
Schematic illustrating bioactivation versus inactivation routes for 4-IPO after either P450- or uridine 5′-diphospho-glucuronosyltransferase-mediated metabolism

However, in humans the reactivity of CYP4B1 is different and it does not activate 4-IPO. The CYP enzymes CYP1A2 and CYP3A4 are active in the liver and are similar to the rodent CYP4B1. 4-IPO is thus metabolically activated by CYP1A2 and CYP3A4 in humans. These two enzymes are both part of several pathways involved in the drug metabolism. As both CYPs are mainly active in the liver, 4-IPO causes hepatotoxicity in humans.

In both rodents and humans phase I metabolism involves the biotransformation of 4-IPO into an epoxide intermediate by CYPs. This epoxide is unstable, so it degrades into an enedial intermediate. The enedial intermediate is toxic, as it can bind to proteins. However, it can be detoxified in phase II metabolism, in which the enedial can be conjugated with either N-acetyl lysine (NAL) or N-acetyl cysteine (NAC). This results in a NAL/NAC-IPO adduct, which can be excreted. Furthermore, 4-IPO can directly undergo phase II metabolism, by conjugating glucuronosyl to the hydroxyl group of 4-IPO by uridine 5’-diphospho-glucuronosyltransferase (UGT), forming 4-IPO glucuronide. This can, like the NAL/NAC-IPO adduct, be excreted. However, the major pathway involves the enedial intermediate and the NAL/NAC-IPO adduct is the major product of biotransformation.

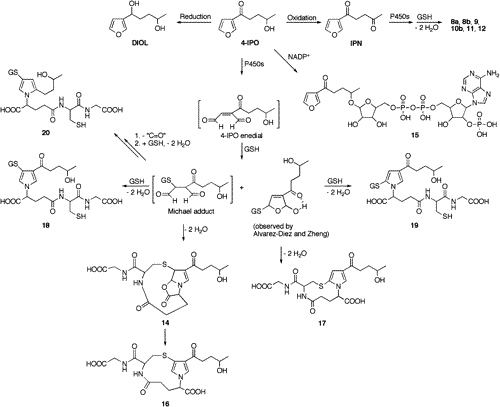
In vitro microsomal incubation of 4-IPO and its GSH adducts as products

In contrast with these findings of in vivo studies, several other pathways for biotransformation of 4-IPO are found in vitro. Next to oxidation of the furan ring of 4-IPO, so that the 4-IPO enedial is formed, the hydroxyl group of 4-IPO can be oxidized. Oxidation of this functional group leads to ketone formation, so IPN is formed. IPN can undergo oxidation of the furan ring by CYPs, like 4-IPO. After this bioactivation reaction, the product can be conjugated to glutathione (GSH) by glutathione-S-transferase (GST). Furthermore, 4-IPO can be reduced and DIOL is the product of this biotransformation. Finally, 4-IPO can interact with [[NADP^{+}]], forming a molecule which contains 4-IPO and NADPH. Of these four pathways described, the oxidation to IPN and the reduction to DIOL are the major processes.

Next to the difference in possible metabolic reactions 4-IPO can undergo, there is also a difference in the metabolization of the reactive 4-IPO enedial. This compound can be metabolized by either UGT or GSH. Metabolization by UGT results in NAL/NAC-IPO adducts, while multiple products can be the result of GSH metabolism. Interaction of the 4-IPO enedial with GSH leads both to a Michael adduct and a dihydrohydroxyfuran adduct. The Michael adduct is the product of a Michael addition (1,4-addition of a cysteine), of the cysteine in GSH at the 4-position of the enedial. This Michael adduct can undergo dehydration and forms, via a tricyclic 2’-pyrroline adduct (14), a mono-GSH pyrrole adduct (16). Another reaction the Michael adduct can undergo is again dehydration and conjugation with GSH. Via the formation of subsequently an imine, enamine and an iminium ion, a bis-GSH pyrrole adduct (18) is formed. Another reaction via which the Michael adduct can form a bis-GSH pyrrole adduct (20), is firstly by undergoing elimination of a ketone group, followed by again dehydration in combination with GSH conjugation.

The dihydrohydroxyfuran adduct can also undergo dehydration in combination with GSH conjugation in a similar way as the Michael adduct, which results in a bis-GSH pyrrole adduct (19). Furthermore, the dihydrohydroxyfuran can dehydrate and form a mono-GSH pyrrole adduct (17).

== Pharmacological use ==
Distribution of 4-IPO across tissues shows the same patterns for intravenous, oral and intraperitoneal injection and peak concentrations are achieved one to two hours after administration. By then most of the 4-IPO will be located in the lungs, followed by liver, kidney and blood. Apart from having the highest 4-IPO concentration, lung cells also show the highest level of covalently bound 4-IPO. This is in contrast with the gut, where the most occurring form of 4-IPO is unbound. After four hours 4-IPO levels show a plateau which persists for 24 hours. 4-IPO molecules still present at that time are mostly bound to other macromolecules. The IC50 was determined by an automated cell culture growth inhibition assay which shows IC50 ranging from 2-8 mM, depending on the cell type. The IC50 was also determined by another group which found roughly the same.

Detoxification is suspected to occur primarily via glucuronidation of 4-IPO. Out of all the metabolites found in urine, the primary excretion pathway, 4-IPO glucuronide was the most abundant. Excretion of 4-IPO glucuronide can be increased when rats were treated with phenobarbital, which increases γ-aminobutyric acid (GABA) activity.

Half-life varies from species to species. In mice the half-life is approximately 33 minutes after intravenous injection of 20 mg/kg 4-IPO. This is lower in rats and dogs. Rats need around six minutes to reduce the 4-IPO concentration by half and dogs around ten minutes. Both were administered a single intravenous dose of 6 mg/kg.

=== Preclinical trials ===
Several in vitro experiments were performed to explore the possible uses of 4-IPO, which showed promising results. Different lung, ovarian, breast and melanoma cancer cell lines showed apoptosis or inhibited tumor growth when exposed to high levels of 4-IPO (100 ug/uL). These results could not be replicated in conventional cancer screens, probably due to the fact that 4-IPO metabolism relies on very specific enzymes and environments which could not be replicated by conventional screens. However, 4-IPO showed effects when exposed to human lung cell lines. Four cell lines were tested and two showed inhibited tumor growth. Both cell lines were non-small cell lung carcinoma, while the two cell lines with no effects were small cell tumors. Other experiments showed that 4-IPO reduced tumor growth in a microencapsulated tumor assay at a concentration of 25 mg/mL. Furthermore, covalent binding of 4-IPO intermediates was observed in fresh lung biopsies.

=== Phase I Trial ===
On the basis of this knowledge a phase I trial was performed to study the effects of 4-IPO on the human body. 34 men and 10 women with non-small cell lung cancer were tested. The trial showed no significant hematological or renal toxicity but also no effect on the tumor. Measurements with biopsies obtained from the patients showed an IC50 of 6 mM, which is around 75 times higher than the measured plasma concentrations and likely higher than the plasma concentration achievable in vivo.

=== Phase II Trial ===
An earlier phase I and pharmacological trial showed that hepatotoxicity is dose limiting in humans and not lung toxicity. Based on these results a phase II trial was conducted to test the effects of 4-IPO on patients with advanced measurable hepatocellular carcinoma. Nineteen patients were treated with 1032 mg/m^{2} 4-IPO. One patient showed a brief reduction in metastasis in the lung, but the rest showed no significant effects. As a consequence the authors recommend that 4-IPO is not used for further testing.

=== Further use in cancer treatment ===
Recently 4-IPO has been used in experiments where it plays a role in T-cell therapy. Autologous T-cells can be altered to express tumor specific antigens. These cells will then bind to tumors and induce apoptosis. There are side-effects associated with this kind of treatment and 4-IPO can help to control those side effects. A suicide gene is needed to induce apoptosis in T-cells when needed. CYP4B1 is inactive in humans but with minor changes in the amino acid sequence it can be activated again. This would result in T-cell death when the cells are exposed to 4-IPO, because they metabolize 4-IPO efficiently. Non toxic 4-IPO analogues are also capable of inhibiting nicotine-derived nitrosamine ketone (NNK) metabolism. NNK is a pre-carcinogen which is activated inside the lung. Out of the four analogues tested (4-hydroxy-lphenyl-1-pentanone (HPP); 7-hydroxy-1-phenyl-1-octanone (HPO); 4-hydroxy-1- (2-thienyl)-1-pentanone (HTP); 4-hydroxy-l-(3-pyridyl)-l-pentanone (HPYP)) HPP and HPO showed competitive and noncompetitive inhibition of NNK and it reduces tumor formation in mice.

== Toxicity ==
4-IPO is a specific lethal toxicant which mainly targets bronchiolar exocrine cells in the smaller bronchioles of rodent and cattle lungs. With an increased dose it is also possible to affect other cells and the airway of organisms. Covalent binding of 4-IPO to members of the CYP family (mainly CYP4B1) eventually leads to biotransformation of 4-IPO into an enedial intermediate, which is able to bind to a variety of proteins. These binding events are permanent and responsible for 4-IPO toxicity. This will result in cytotoxicity and eventually necrosis of bronchiolar exocrine cells, while ciliated bronchiolar cells and other epithelial lung cells are not affected, due to lower levels of cytochrome proteins. Necrotic patches, also called lesions or primary pathological changes, can develop into edemas, resulting in thickening of the alveolar septum, congestion, and hemorrhage (secondary and tertiary pathological changes). Lethality is probably due to pulmonary edema. Prior to death the dogs also showed rapid and shallow respiration, while in rats labored respiration and lymphocyte depletion can be observed. The LD_{50} dose varies between different species. In female mice 21 mg/kg/day 4-IPO are sufficient while in male mice 35 mg/kg/day were necessary. 15 mg/kg 4-IPO intravenously administered into rats is lethal and in dogs this dose is 12 mg/kg. It is possible to increase the LD_{50} by 2–4.5 fold when individuals are treated with multiple non-toxic doses beforehand.

In humans, 4-IPO shows minimal effects in the lung because the enzymes needed for biotransformation of 4-IPO are not present. Instead the liver is affected, because human liver cells do contain enzymes to biotransform 4-IPO. Something similar can be observed in male mice. Apart from the effects seen in the lungs they also have certain enzymes in their kidney which can transform 4-IPO into its reactive intermediate. As a result, renal toxicity is observed. Female mice and immature male mice do not have these enzymes. Therefore, they are resistant to renal toxicity.

== Effects on animals ==
4-IPO has, similar to humans, a toxic effect on animals. It is toxic to livestock and many laboratory animals. Male rabbits, mice, rats and hamsters were used to test the effect of 4-IPO on. In all four species, the lung was a major target. In the hamsters and mice additional liver necrosis and renal necrosis, respectively, was detected. 4-IPO can also threaten newborn calves. If they become exposed to 4-IPO it increases their susceptibility to bovine parainfluenza virus 3. Parainfluenza itself does not have severe health effects but together with other infections it can lead to complex enzootic pneumonia.
