= Locant =

Prefix in organic chemistry nomenclature

In the nomenclature of organic chemistry, a locant is a term to indicate the position of a functional group or substituent within a molecule.

== Numeric locants ==
Pentan-2-one or 2-pentanone

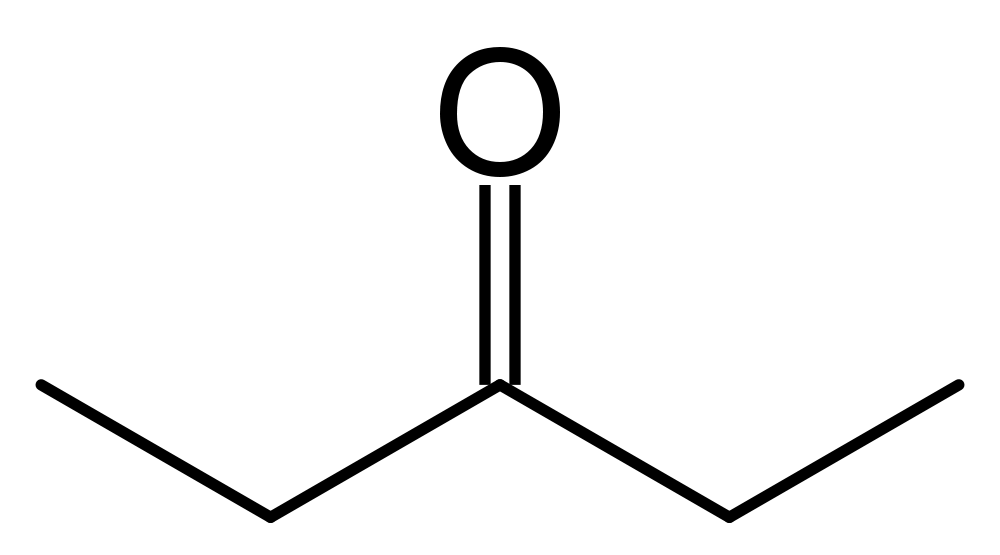
pentan-3-one or 3-pentanone

The International Union of Pure and Applied Chemistry (IUPAC) recommends the use of numeric prefixes to indicate the position of substituents, generally by identifying the parent hydrocarbon chain and assigning the carbon atoms based on their substituents in order of precedence. For example, there are at least two isomers of the linear form of pentanone, a ketone that contains a chain of exactly five carbon atoms. There is an oxygen atom bonded to one of the middle three carbons (if it were bonded to an end carbon, the molecule would be an aldehyde, not a ketone), but it is not clear where it is located.

In this example, the carbon atoms are numbered from one to five, which starts at one end and proceeds sequentially along the chain. Now the position of the oxygen atom can be defined as on carbon atom number two, three or four. However, atoms two and four are exactly equivalent - which can be shown by turning the molecule around by 180 degrees.

The locant is the number of the carbon atom to which the oxygen atom is bonded. If the oxygen is bonded to the middle carbon, the locant is 3. If the oxygen is bonded to an atom on either side (adjacent to an end carbon), the locant is 2 or 4; given the choice here, where the carbons are exactly equivalent, the lower number is always chosen. So the locant is either 2 or 3 in this molecule.

The locant is incorporated into the name of the molecule to remove ambiguity. Thus the molecule is named either pentan-2-one or pentan-3-one, depending on the position of the oxygen atom.

Any side chains can be present in the place of oxygen and it can be defined as simply the number on the carbon to which any thing other than a hydrogen is attached.

== Greek letter locants ==
α- and β-carbons in the skeletal formula of benzylacetone. The carbonyl has two β-hydrogens and five α-hydrogens.

Skeletal formula of butyric acid with the α, β, and γ-carbons marked

Another common system uses Greek letter prefixes as locants, which is useful in identifying the relative location of carbon atoms as well as hydrogen atoms to other functional groups.

The α-carbon (alpha-carbon) refers to the first carbon atom that attaches to a functional group, such as a carbonyl. The second carbon atom is called the β-carbon (beta-carbon), the third is the γ-carbon (gamma-carbon), and the naming system continues in alphabetical order.

The nomenclature can also be applied to the hydrogen atoms attached to the carbon atoms. A hydrogen atom attached to an α-carbon is called an α-hydrogen, a hydrogen atom on the β-carbon is a β-hydrogen, and so on.

Organic molecules with more than one functional group can be a source of confusion. Generally the functional group responsible for the name or type of the molecule is the 'reference' group for purposes of carbon-atom naming. For example, the molecules nitrostyrene and phenethylamine are quite similar; the former can even be reduced into the latter. However, nitrostyrene's α-carbon atom is adjacent to the phenyl group; in phenethylamine this same carbon atom is the β-carbon atom, as phenethylamine (being an amine rather than a styrene) counts its atoms from the opposite "end" of the molecule.

Nitrostyrene

Phenethylamine

=== Proteins and amino acids ===
In proteins and amino acids, the α-carbon is the backbone carbon before the carbonyl carbon atom in the molecule. Therefore, reading along the backbone of a typical protein would give a sequence of –[N—Cα—carbonyl C]_{n}– etc. (when reading in the N to C direction). The α-carbon is where the different substituents attach to each different amino acid. That is, the groups hanging off the chain at the α-carbon are what give amino acids their diversity. These groups give the α-carbon its stereogenic properties for every amino acid except for glycine. Therefore, the α-carbon is a stereocenter for every amino acid except glycine. Glycine also does not have a β-carbon, while every other amino acid does.

The α-carbon of an amino acid is significant in protein folding. When describing a protein, which is a chain of amino acids, one often approximates the location of each amino acid as the location of its α-carbon. In general, α-carbons of adjacent amino acids in a protein are about 3.8 ångströms (380 picometers) apart.

=== Enols and enolates ===
The α-carbon is important for enol- and enolate-based carbonyl chemistry as well. Chemical transformations affected by the conversion to either an enolate or an enol, in general, lead to the α-carbon acting as a nucleophile, becoming, for example, alkylated in the presence of primary haloalkane. An exception is in reaction with silyl chlorides, bromides, and iodides, where the oxygen acts as the nucleophile to produce silyl enol ether.

== See also ==
- IUPAC nomenclature
- Regioisomer (also known as positional isomer)
- Descriptor (chemistry)
