= Sodium propionate =

Chemical compound

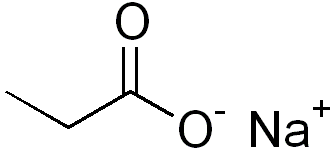

Names
- Preferred IUPAC name Sodium propanoate
- Other names Sodium propionate Napropion; E281

Identifiers
CAS Number	137-40-6
3D model (JSmol)	Interactive image
ChEBI	CHEBI:132106
ChEMBL	ChEMBL500826
ChemSpider	8399
ECHA InfoCard	100.004.810
EC Number	205-290-4
E number	E281 (preservatives)
PubChem CID	2723816
UNII	DK6Y9P42IN
CompTox Dashboard (EPA)	DTXSID7021996
- InChI: InChI=1S/C3H6O2.Na/c1-2-3(4)5;/h2H2,1H3,(H,4,5);/q;+1/p-1 Key: JXKPEJDQGNYQSM-UHFFFAOYSA-M; InChI=1/C3H6O2.Na/c1-2-3(4)5;/h2H2,1H3,(H,4,5);/q;+1/p-1 Key: JXKPEJDQGNYQSM-REWHXWOFAH
- SMILES: [Na+].[O-]C(=O)CC

Properties
Chemical formula	C_{3}H_{5}NaO_{2}
Molar mass	96.060 g/mol
Appearance	Transparent crystals
Odor	faint acetic-butyric odor
Melting point	289 °C (552 °F; 562 K)
Solubility in water	1 g/mL
Solubility in ethanol	41.7 g/L

Pharmacology
ATC code	S01AX10 (WHO) QA16QA02 (WHO)

Hazards
- GHS labelling
Pictograms	(GHS05: Corrosive) (GHS07: Exclamation mark) (GHS09: Environmental hazard)
Signal word	Danger
Hazard statements	H302, H317, H318, H411
Precautionary statements	P261, P264, P264+P265, P270, P272, P273, P280, P301+P317, P302+P352, P305+P354+P338, P317, P321, P330, P333+P317, P362+P364, P391, P501
- Lethal dose or concentration (LD, LC)
LD_{50} (median dose)	6332 mg/kg (mouse, oral)
- Except where otherwise noted, data are given for materials in their standard state (at 25 °C [77 °F], 100 kPa). verify (what is ?) Infobox references

Sodium propanoate or sodium propionate is the sodium salt of propionic acid which has the chemical formula Na(C_{2}H_{5}COO). This white crystalline solid is deliquescent in moist air.

== Structure ==
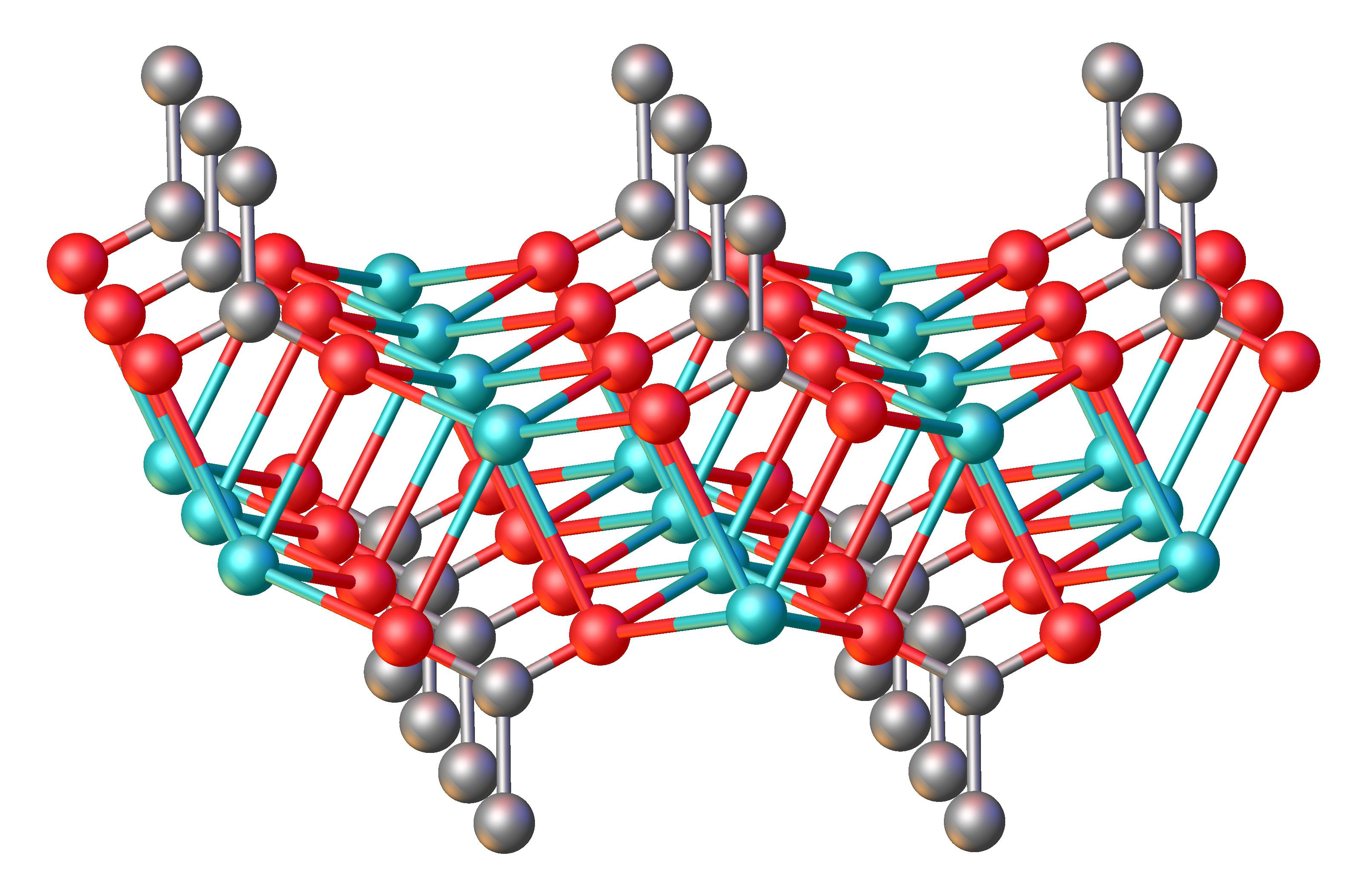
Structure of sodium propionate, with methyl groups and H atoms omitted. Color code: red = O, blue = Na.

Anhydrous sodium propionate is a polymeric structure, featuring trigonal prismatic Na^{+} centers bonded to six oxygen ligands provided by the carboxylates. A layered structure is observed, with the hydrophobic ethyl groups projecting into the layered galleries. With hydrated sodium propionate, some of these Na-carboxylate linkages are displaced by water.

== Preparation ==
It is produced by the reaction of propionic acid and sodium carbonate or sodium hydroxide.

== Uses ==
It is used as a food preservative and is represented by the food labeling E number E281 in Europe; it is used primarily as a mold inhibitor in bakery products. It is approved for use as a food additive in the EU, USA and Australia and New Zealand (where it is listed by its INS number 281).

== Reactions ==
Decomposition takes place via ketonization, yielding the symmetric ketone (3-pentanone) and sodium carbonate:

2Na(O_{2}CEt) → Na_{2}CO_{3} + Et(CO)Et

Some side reactions resulting in the release of carbon dioxide are observed.

== See also ==
- Propionic acid, E 280
- Calcium propionate, E 282
- Potassium propionate, E 283
