= C3H9N =

The molecular formula C_{3}H_{9}N (molar mass: 59.11 g/mol) may refer to:

- Ethylmethylamine, or N-methylethanamine
- Isopropylamine
- Propylamine
- Trimethylamine (TMA)
