= Pentanone =

Pentanone may refer to the following ketones containing five carbon atoms:

- 2-Pentanone (Methyl propyl ketone, MPK)
  - 3-Methyl-2-butanone (Methyl isopropyl ketone, MIPK)
- 3-Pentanone (Diethyl ketone, DEK)

== See also ==
- Cyclopentanone
