= Propanamide =

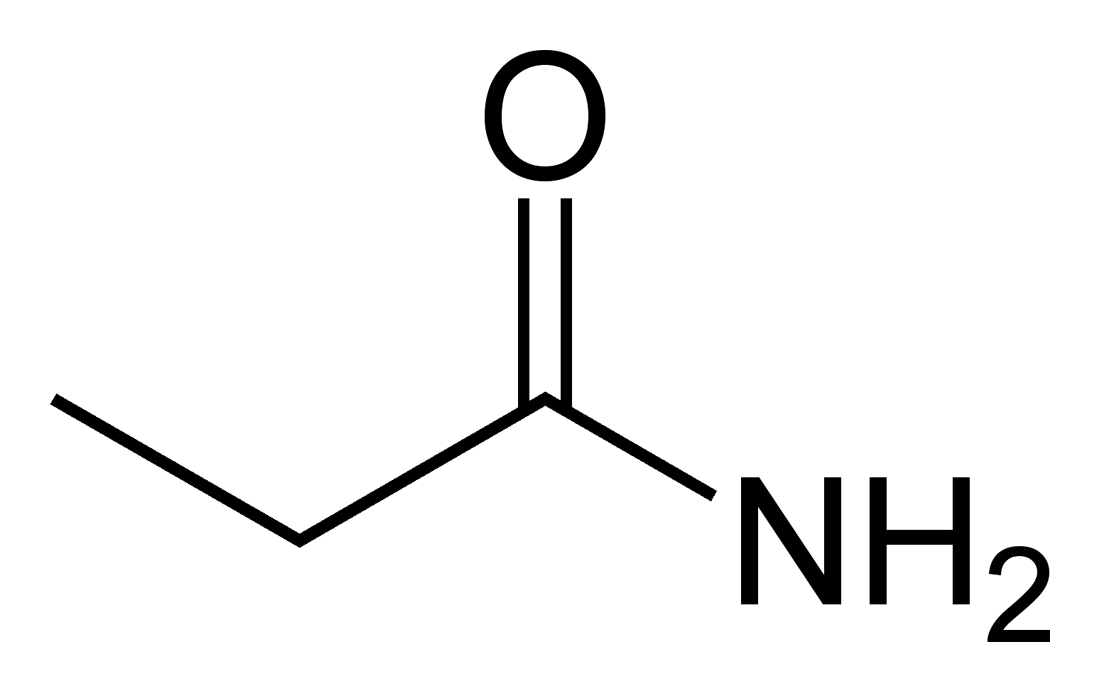
Skeletal formula
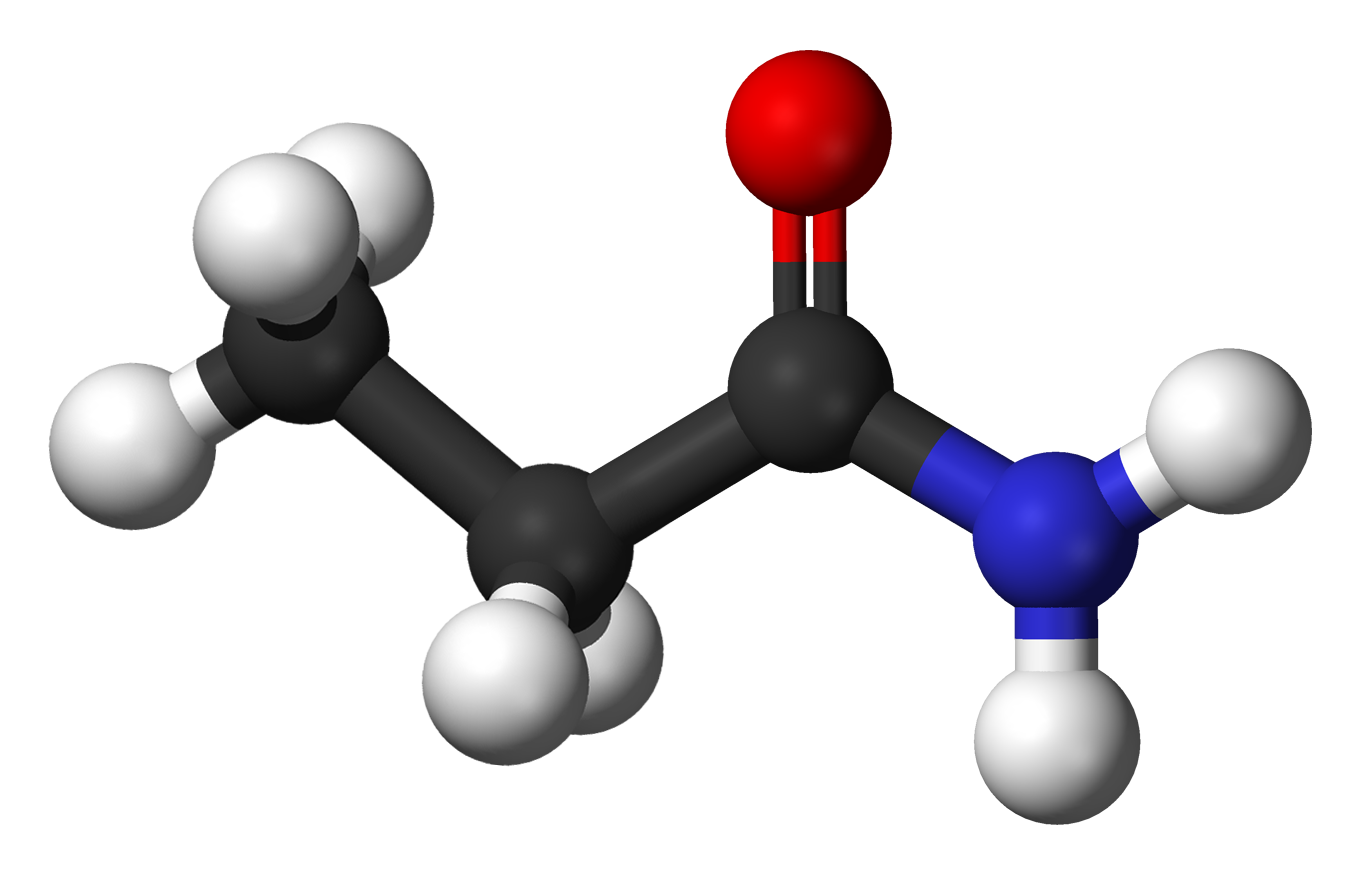
Ball-and-stick model

Names
- Preferred IUPAC name Propanamide
- Other names n-propylamide Propionamide; Propylamide; Propionic amide

Identifiers
CAS Number	79-05-0
3D model (JSmol)	Interactive image
ChEBI	CHEBI:45422
ChemSpider	6330
ECHA InfoCard	100.001.066
EC Number	201-182-6
MeSH	C034666
PubChem CID	6578
UNII	QK07G0HP47
CompTox Dashboard (EPA)	DTXSID3058820
- InChI: InChI=1S/C3H7NO/c1-2-3(4)5/h2H2,1H3,(H2,4,5) Key: QLNJFJADRCOGBJ-UHFFFAOYSA-N; InChI=1/C3H7NO/c1-2-3(4)5/h2H2,1H3,(H2,4,5) Key: QLNJFJADRCOGBJ-UHFFFAOYAE
- SMILES: CCC(=O)N

Properties
Chemical formula	C_{3}H_{7}NO
Molar mass	73.095 g·mol^{−1}
Appearance	liquid, yellow
Density	1.042 g/mL
Melting point	80 °C (176 °F; 353 K)
Boiling point	213 °C (415 °F; 486 K)
Solubility in water	very soluble in water
- Except where otherwise noted, data are given for materials in their standard state (at 25 °C [77 °F], 100 kPa). verify (what is ?) Infobox references

Propanamide has the chemical formula CH_{3}CH_{2}C=O(NH_{2}). It is the amide of propanoic acid.

This organic compound is a mono-substituted amide. Organic compounds of the amide group can react in many different organic processes to form other useful compounds for synthesis.

== Preparation ==
Propanamide can be prepared by the condensation reaction between urea and propanoic acid:

(NH_{2})_{2}CO + 2 CH_{3}CH_{2}COOH → 2CH_{3}CH_{2}CO(NH_{2}) + H_{2}O + CO_{2}

or by the dehydration of ammonium propionate:

(NH_{4})CH_{3}CH_{2}COO → CH_{3}CH_{2}CONH_{2} + H_{2}O

== Reactions ==
Propanamide being an amide can participate in a Hofmann rearrangement to produce ethylamine gas.
