= Beta-diketone hydrolase =

Class of enzymes

Identifiers
- EC no.: 3.7.1.7
- CAS no.: 97955-12-9

Databases
- BRENDA: enzyme data
- ExPASy: NiceZyme view
- KEGG: enzyme entry
- MetaCyc: metabolic pathway
- Rhea: reactions
- PDB structures: RCSB PDB PDBe PDBsum
- Gene Ontology: AmiGO / QuickGO
Search
- PMC: articles
- PubMed: articles
- NCBI: proteins

Beta-diketone hydrolase (EC 3.7.1.7) is an enzyme characterised from soil bacteria that catalyzes the hydrolysis of nonane-4,6-dione to 2-pentanone and butyric acid:

nonane-4,6-dione
H_{2}O
2-pentanone
+
butyric acid

The natural substrate of the enzyme are diketones produced by the oxidation of polyvinyl alcohol, a water-soluble polymer. Nonane-4,6,-dione was used as a simple analogue of these compounds, and the enzyme is therefore of interest in recycling polyvinyl alcohol and other biodegradable polymers. Related bacterial enzymes have been shown to be capable of cleaving beta-diketones in steroids.

This enzyme is a hydrolase, specifically one acting on carbon-carbon bonds in ketonic substances. The systematic name of this enzyme class is nonane-4,6-dione acylhydrolase. This enzyme is also called oxidized PVA hydrolase.

== Structural studies ==
As of late 2007, two structures have been solved for this class of enzymes, with PDB accession codes PDB: 2J5G and PDB: 2J5S.
