= C9H12O3 =

The molecular formula C_{9}H_{12}O_{3} (molar mass: 168.19 g/mol, exact mass: 168.078 u) may refer to:

- Homovanillyl alcohol
- 4-Ipomeanol (4-IPO)
- Veratrole alcohol
