= Aluminium carbide =

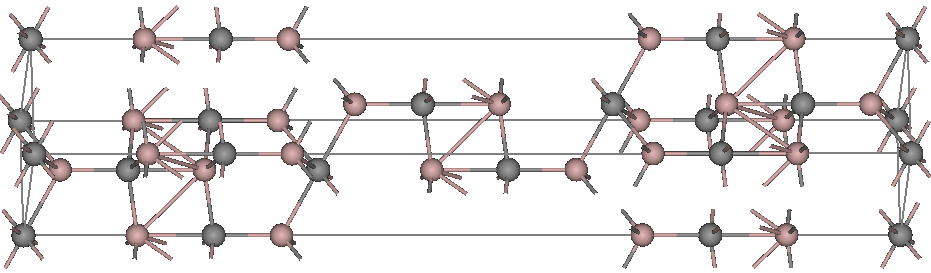
- Unit cell ball and stick model of aluminium carbide

Names
- Preferred IUPAC name Aluminium carbide
- Other names: Tetraaluminium tricarbide; Aluminium methanide

Identifiers
CAS Number	1299-86-1; 12656-43-8
3D model (JSmol)	Interactive image
ChemSpider	21241412
ECHA InfoCard	100.013.706
EC Number	215-076-2
MeSH	Aluminum+carbide
PubChem CID	16685054
UN number	1394
CompTox Dashboard (EPA)	DTXSID10107594
- InChI: InChI=1S/3C.4Al/q3*-4;4*+3 Key: TWHBEKGYWPPYQL-UHFFFAOYSA-N; InChI=1/3C.4Al/q3*-4;4*+3 Key: TWHBEKGYWPPYQL-UHFFFAOYAR
- SMILES: [Al+3].[Al+3].[Al+3].[Al+3].[C-4].[C-4].[C-4]

Properties
Chemical formula	Al_{4}C_{3}
Molar mass	143.95853 g/mol
Appearance	colorless (when pure) hexagonal crystals
Odor	odorless
Density	2.36 g/cm^{3}
Melting point	2,100 °C (3,810 °F; 2,370 K)
Boiling point	decomposes at 1400 °C
Solubility in water	Evolves methane (CH_{4}), Al(OH)3, and heat.

Structure
Crystal structure	Rhombohedral, hR21, space group
Space group	R3̅m（No. 166）
Lattice constant	a = 0.3335 nm, b = 0.3335 nm, c = 0.85422 nm α = 78.743°, β = 78.743°, γ = 60°

Thermochemistry
Heat capacity (C)	116.8 J/(mol·K)
Std molar entropy (S^{⦵}_{298})	88.95 J/(mol·K)
Std enthalpy of formation (Δ_{f}H^{⦵}_{298})	−209 kJ/mol
Gibbs free energy (Δ_{f}G^{⦵})	−196 kJ/mol

Hazards
- GHS labelling
Pictograms	(GHS02: Flammable) (GHS07: Exclamation mark)
Signal word	Danger
Hazard statements	H228, H261, H315, H319, H335
Precautionary statements	P223, P231+P232, P261, P264, P271, P280, P302+P352, P304+P340+P312, P305+P351+P338, P332+P313, P335+P334, P337+P313, P362, P370+P378, P402+P404, P403+P233, P405, P501
NFPA 704 (fire diamond)	2 2 2 W
Safety data sheet (SDS)	Fisher Science SDS
- Except where otherwise noted, data are given for materials in their standard state (at 25 °C [77 °F], 100 kPa). verify (what is ?) Infobox references

Aluminium carbide is a chemical compound with the chemical formula Al_{4}C_{3}. It is a carbide of aluminium. It has the appearance of pale yellow to brown crystals. It is stable up to 1,400 °C (2,550 °F). It decomposes in water with the production of methane.

== Preparation ==
Aluminium carbide is prepared by direct reaction of aluminium and carbon in an electric arc furnace.

4 Al + 3 C → Al_{4}C_{3}

An alternative reaction begins with alumina, but it is less favorable because of generation of carbon monoxide.

2 Al_{2}O_{3} + 9 C → Al_{4}C_{3} + 6 CO

Silicon carbide also reacts with aluminium to yield Al_{4}C_{3}. This conversion limits the mechanical applications of SiC, because Al_{4}C_{3} is more brittle than SiC.

4 Al + 3 SiC → Al_{4}C_{3} + 3 Si

== Reactions ==
Aluminium carbide hydrolyses with evolution of methane and considerable amounts of heat.

Al_{4}C_{3} + 12 H_{2}O → 4 Al(OH)_{3} + 3 CH_{4}

The addition of 10g of Al_{4}C_{3} to 10g of water was found to reach a maximum temperature of 387 °F (197 °C) at a time of 11 minutes in one study, while in another the addition of 20g of Al_{4}C_{3} to 10g of water reached a maximum temperature of 280 °F (138 °C). Reversing the order and adding 10g of water to 20g of Al_{4}C_{3} reached a maximum temperature of 349 °F (176 °C).

Similar reactions occur with other protic reagents:

Al_{4}C_{3} + 12 HCl → 4 AlCl_{3} + 3 CH_{4}

=== Composites ===
Reactive hot isostatic pressing (hipping) at ≈40 megapascals (390 atm) of the appropriate mixtures of Ti, Al_{4}C_{3}-graphite, for 15 hours at 1,300 °C (2,370 °F) yields predominantly single-phase samples of Ti_{2}AlC_{0.5}N_{0.5}, 30 hours at 1,300 °C (2,370 °F) yields predominantly single-phase samples of Ti_{2}AlC (Titanium aluminium carbide).

In aluminium-matrix composites reinforced with silicon carbide, the chemical reactions between silicon carbide and molten aluminium generate a layer of aluminium carbide on the silicon carbide particles, which decreases the strength of the material, although it increases the wettability of the SiC particles. This tendency can be decreased by coating the silicon carbide particles with a suitable oxide or nitride, preoxidation of the particles to form a silica coating, or using a layer of sacrificial metal.

An aluminium-aluminium carbide composite material can be made by mechanical alloying, by mixing aluminium powder with graphite particles.

== Structure ==
Aluminium carbide has an unusual crystal structure that consists of alternating layers of Al_{2}C and Al_{2}C_{2}. Each aluminium atom is coordinated to 4 carbon atoms to give a tetrahedral arrangement. Carbon atoms exist in 2 different binding environments; one is a deformed octahedron of 6 Al atoms at a distance of 217 pm. The other is a distorted trigonal bipyramidal structure of 4 Al atoms at 190–194 pm and a fifth Al atom at 221 pm.

== Occurrence ==
Small amounts of aluminium carbide are a common impurity of technical calcium carbide. In electrolytic manufacturing of aluminium, aluminium carbide forms as a corrosion product of the graphite electrodes.

In metal matrix composites based on aluminium matrix reinforced with non-metal carbides (silicon carbide, boron carbide, etc.) or carbon fibres, aluminium carbide often forms as an unwanted product. In case of carbon fibre, it reacts with the aluminium matrix at temperatures above 500 °C (932 °F); better wetting of the fibre and inhibition of chemical reaction can be achieved by coating it with e.g. titanium boride.

== Applications ==
Aluminium carbide particles finely dispersed in aluminium matrix lower the tendency of the material to creep, especially in combination with silicon carbide particles.

Aluminium carbide can be used as an abrasive in high-speed cutting tools. It has approximately the same hardness as topaz.

== See also ==
- List of compounds with carbon number 3
