= Calcium propanoate =

Names
- Preferred IUPAC name Calcium dipropanoate
- Other names Calcium propionate Calcium dipropionate Mycoban; E282

Identifiers
| CAS Number | 4075-81-4 |
| 3D model (JSmol) | Interactive image |
| ChemSpider | 18840 |
| ECHA InfoCard | 100.021.633 |
| EC Number | 223-795-8 |
| E number | E282 (preservatives) |
| KEGG | D09875 |
| PubChem CID | 19999 |
| UNII | 8AI80040KW |
| CompTox Dashboard (EPA) | DTXSID90904548 DTXSID1027556, DTXSID90904548 |
- InChI: InChI=1S/2C3H6O2.Ca/c2*1-2-3(4)5;/h2*2H2,1H3,(H,4,5);/q;;+2/p-2 Key: BCZXFFBUYPCTSJ-UHFFFAOYSA-L; InChI=1/2C3H6O2.Ca/c2*1-2-3(4)5;/h2*2H2,1H3,(H,4,5);/q;;+2/p-2 Key: BCZXFFBUYPCTSJ-NUQVWONBAE
- SMILES: CCC(=O)[O-].CCC(=O)[O-].[Ca+2]

Properties
| Chemical formula | C_{6}H_{10}CaO_{4} |
| Molar mass | 186.2192 g/mol |
| Appearance | White crystalline solid |
| Melting point | 385 °C (725 °F; 658 K) |
| Solubility in water | 49 g/100 mL (0 °C); 55.8 g/100 mL (100 °C) |
| Solubility | slightly soluble in methanol, ethanol insoluble in acetone, benzene |

Structure
| Crystal structure | monoclinic |

Hazards
- GHS labelling
| Pictograms | (GHS05: Corrosive) |
| Signal word | Danger |
| Hazard statements | H318 |
| Precautionary statements | P264+P265, P280, P305+P354+P338, P317 |
| NFPA 704 (fire diamond) | 2 1 0 |
- Except where otherwise noted, data are given for materials in their standard state (at 25 °C [77 °F], 100 kPa). verify (what is ?) Infobox references

Calcium propanoate or calcium propionate is a chemical compound with the chemical formula Ca(C_{2}H_{5}COO)_{2}. It is the calcium salt of propanoic acid.

== Uses ==
=== Food additive ===
As a food additive, it is listed as E number 282 in the Codex Alimentarius. Calcium propionate is used as a preservative in a variety of products including bread, baked goods, processed meat, whey, and dairy products. It is only effective in foods with a pH of 5.5 or below (i.e., foods that are relatively more acidic).

In bakery products, it acts as a mold inhibitor, typically added at 0.1–0.4%. Calcium propionate and sodium propanoate are effective against both Bacillus mesentericus (rope) and mold.

=== Agriculture ===
In agriculture, it is used to prevent milk fever in cows and as a feed supplement.

It can be used as a fungicide on fruit.

=== Industrial ===
It is of research interest in the production of belite cement clinkers and as a dual NO_{x}/SO_{x} reducing agent in coal furnaces.

== Reactions ==
Thermal decomposition in an inert atmosphere follows a radical mechanism that yields 3-pentanone. In the presence of oxygen, an exothermic reaction occurs involving the formation of carbon dioxide, carbon monoxide, acetaldehyde, methane and water. This occurs at approximately 310 °C (590 °F; 583 K), while the radical pathway occurs near the melting point at 385 °C (725 °F; 658 K). Both pathways end in the formation of calcite.

== Safety ==
In a 1973 study reported by the EPA, the waterborne administration of 180 ppm of calcium propionate was found to be slightly toxic to bluegill sunfish.
