= Nonanone =

Nonanone may refer to:

- 2-Nonanone
- 3-Nonanone
- 4-Nonanone
- 5-Nonanone
