= Trimethylamine N-oxide =

TMAO Chemical compound

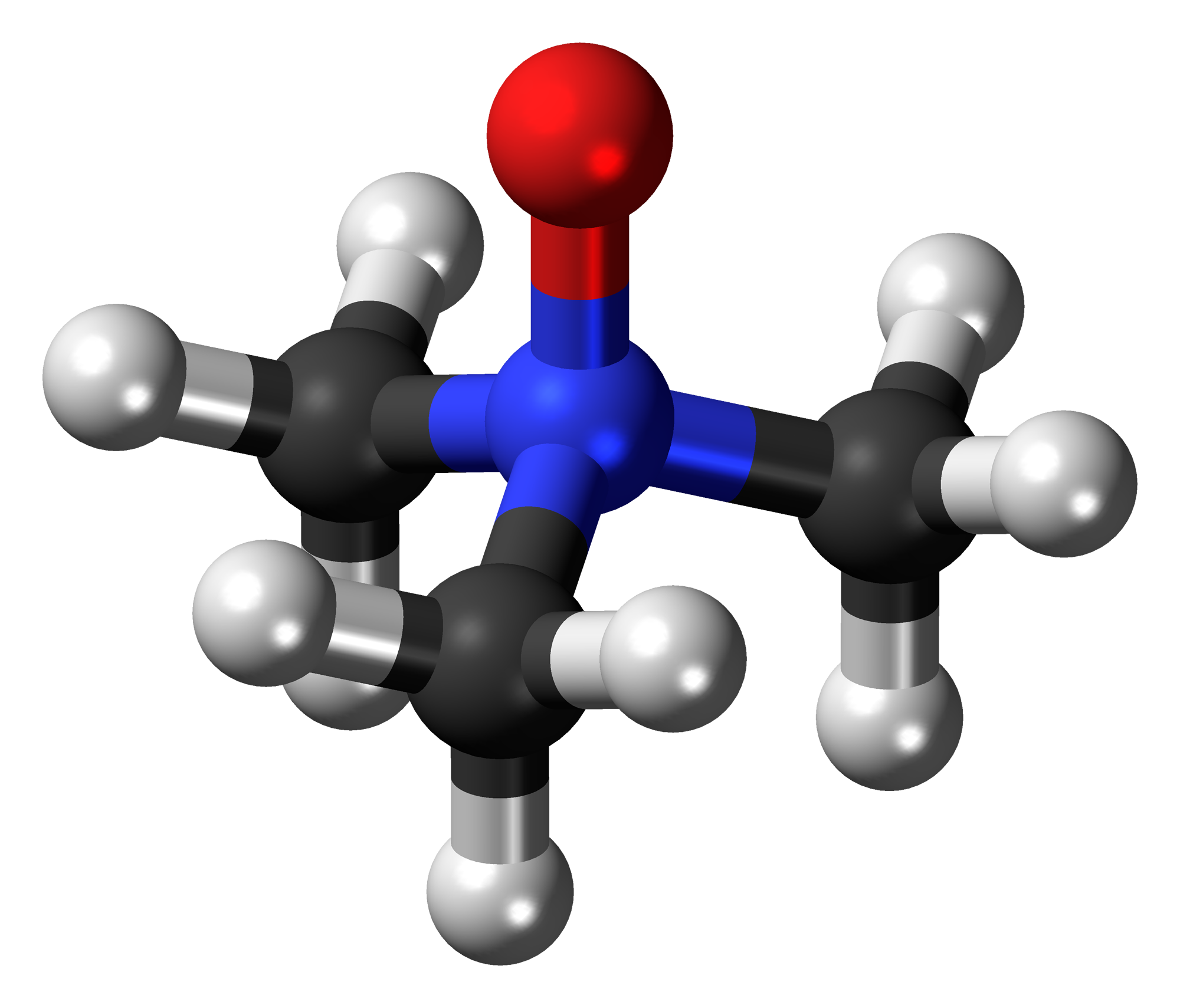

Names
- Preferred IUPAC name N,N-Dimethylmethanamine N-oxide
- Other names Trimethylamine oxide, TMAO, TMANO

Identifiers
CAS Number	1184-78-7; 62637-93-8 (dihydrate)
3D model (JSmol)	Interactive image
ChEBI	CHEBI:15724
ChemSpider	1113
ECHA InfoCard	100.013.341
KEGG	C01104
PubChem CID	1145
UNII	FLD0K1SJ1A; C73WZ0186W (dihydrate)
CompTox Dashboard (EPA)	DTXSID001030179 DTXSID8049678, DTXSID001030179
- InChI: InChI=1S/C3H9NO/c1-4(2,3)5/h1-3H3 Key: UYPYRKYUKCHHIB-UHFFFAOYSA-N; InChI=1/C3H9NO/c1-4(2,3)5/h1-3H3 Key: UYPYRKYUKCHHIB-UHFFFAOYAU
- SMILES: C[N+](C)(C)[O-]

Properties
Chemical formula	(CH_{3})_{3}NO
Molar mass	75.111 g·mol^{−1}
Appearance	colorless solid
Melting point	220 to 222 °C (428 to 432 °F; 493 to 495 K) (dihydrate: 96°C)
Solubility in water	good
Dipole moment	5.4 D

Related compounds
Related compounds	Trifluoramine oxide; Trimethylphosphine oxide
- Except where otherwise noted, data are given for materials in their standard state (at 25 °C [77 °F], 100 kPa). verify (what is ?) Infobox references

Trimethylamine N-oxide (TMAO) is an organic compound with the formula (CH_{3})_{3}NO. It is in the class of amine oxides. Although the anhydrous compound is known, trimethylamine N-oxide is usually encountered as the dihydrate. Both the anhydrous and hydrated materials are white, water-soluble solids.

TMAO is found in higher concentration than in land animals in the tissues of marine crustaceans and marine fish, where it prevents water pressure from denaturing proteins and ultimately prevents the death of the animal. The concentration of TMAO increases with the depth at which the animal lives; TMAO is found in high concentrations in the deepest-living described fish species, Pseudoliparis swirei, which was found in the Mariana Trench, at a recorded depth of 8,076 m (26,496 ft).

In animals, TMAO is a product of the oxidation of trimethylamine, a common metabolite of trimethyl quaternary ammonium compounds, like choline, trimethylglycine, and L-carnitine. High TMAO concentrations are associated with an increased risk of all-cause mortality and cardiovascular disease in man. Thus in man potential use of TMAO as a therapeutic modulator in disorders where models suggest potential benefit such as some protein folding disorders is contraversial.

== Marine animals ==
Trimethylamine N-oxide is an osmolyte found in molluscs, crustaceans, and all marine fish and bony fish. It acts as a protein stabilizer that serves predominantly to counteract the protein-destabilizing effects of pressure. In general, the bodies of animals living at great depths are adapted to high pressure environments by having pressure-resistant biomolecules and small organic molecules present in their cells, known as piezolytes, of which TMAO is the most abundant. These piezolytes give the proteins the flexibility they need to function properly under great pressure.

TMAO decomposes to trimethylamine (TMA), which is the main odorant that is characteristic of degrading seafood from microbial breakdown.

== TMAO in diet ==
TMAO levels increase with consumption of animal protein such as red meat, shellfish, and total fish consumption. Plant-based diets such as vegan, vegetarian and the Mediterranean diet lower TMAO levels. This is believed to be related to its production by the gut microbiome.

== Chemistry ==
TMAO can be synthesized from trimethylamine by treatment with hydrogen peroxide:

(CH_{3})_{3}N + H_{2}O_{2} → H_{2}O + (CH_{3})_{3}NO

The dihydrate is dehydrated by azeotropic distillation from dimethylformamide.

=== Laboratory applications ===
Trimethylamine oxide is used in protein folding experiments to counteract the unfolding effects of urea. It is believed that in biological systems urea and TMAOs contrasting actions on protein, nucleic acid and membrane stability are important and likely they are two chaperons involved in the intracellular regulation of these cellular components in organisms.

In the organometallic chemistry reaction of nucleophilic abstraction, (CH_{3})_{3}NO is employed as a decarbonylation agent according to the following stoichiometry:

M(CO)_{n} + (CH_{3})_{3}NO + L → M(CO)_{n−1}L + (CH_{3})_{3}N + CO_{2}

where M is a metal. This reaction is used to decomplex organic ligands from metals, e.g. from (diene)Fe(CO)_{3}.

It is used in certain oxidation reactions, e.g. the conversion of alkyl iodides to the corresponding aldehyde.

==== Effects on protein stability ====
TMAO can act as a protein chaperon. The effects of TMAO on the backbone and charged residues of peptides are found to stabilize compact conformations, whereas effects of TMAO on nonpolar residues lead to peptide swelling. This suggests competing mechanisms of TMAO on proteins, which accounts for hydrophobic swelling, backbone collapse, and stabilization of charge-charge interactions. These mechanisms are observed in Trp cage.

=== Effects as a osmolyte ===
Of the common osmolytes found in biological systems TMAO has the lowest self-solvation values and highest osmotic coefficient approaching the ideal of 1.0.

=== Effects on nucleic acids ===
TMAO stabilses the teritiay structure of both DNA and RNA, partially due in part to effects on their phosphate backbone.

=== Effects on cell membranes ===
TMAO has been found to have two actions:

1. An incease in phospholipid packing density with less water content as it is excluded from the hydrated lipid membrane surface due to unfavorable

interactions with polar lipid head groups

1. An incease in the fluid/gel phase transition temperature

=== Effects on liquid−liquid phase separation ===
Biomolecular condensate formation into emulsions can be modulated by TMAO with enhanced beneficial form of Ribonucleoprotein particle condensation while inhibiting harmful fibrillar aggregation.

== Disorders ==
=== Trimethylaminuria ===
Trimethylaminuria is a rare defect in the production of the enzyme flavin-containing monooxygenase 3 (FMO3). Those suffering from trimethylaminuria are unable to convert choline-derived trimethylamine into trimethylamine oxide. Trimethylamine then accumulates and is released in the person's sweat, urine, and breath, giving off a strong fishy odor.

== Health effects ==
=== Mortality ===
Higher circulating TMAO concentrations are associated with an increased risk of all-cause mortality in man.

=== Cardiovascular disease ===
Higher circulating TMAO concentrations are associated with an increased risk in man of cardiovascular events and strokes in particular.

=== Hypertension ===
Higher circulating TMAO concentrations are associated in man with an increased risk of hypertension.

=== Potential toxicity ===
The cardiovascular risk in man is outlined above. One issue is that the risk may be restricted to European and American populations as for example the association with hypertension was not found in Asian populations. Exposure limit guidelines in man with a detailed description of toxicity are available such as "Recommendation from the Scientific Committee on Occupational Exposure Limits" by the European Union Commission. A potential association with increased risk of impaired memory in Chinese populations has implicated the anaerobic bacterial production by a strain of Blautia producta of TMAO in the gut as a potential causitive factor for Alzheimer's disease progression.

== See also ==
- Greenland shark
- Rhodospirillum rubrum
