= Potassium propanoate =

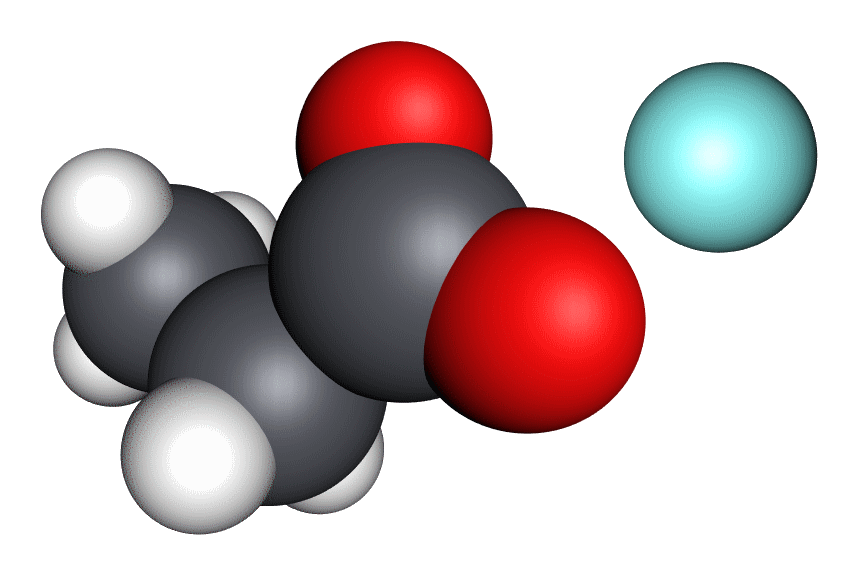

Names
- Preferred IUPAC name Potassium propanoate
- Other names Potassium propionate; E283

Identifiers
CAS Number	327-62-8
3D model (JSmol)	Interactive image
ChemSpider	64232
ECHA InfoCard	100.005.749
EC Number	206-323-5
E number	E283 (preservatives)
PubChem CID	23663619
UNII	7H1F04CKTX
CompTox Dashboard (EPA)	DTXSID50186368
- InChI: InChI=1S/C3H6O2.K/c1-2-3(4)5;/h2H2,1H3,(H,4,5);/q;+1/p-1 Key: BWILYWWHXDGKQA-UHFFFAOYSA-M; InChI=1/C3H6O2.K/c1-2-3(4)5;/h2H2,1H3,(H,4,5);/q;+1/p-1 Key: BWILYWWHXDGKQA-REWHXWOFAC
- SMILES: CCC(=O)[O-].[K+]

Properties
Chemical formula	C_{3}H_{5}KO_{2}
Molar mass	112.1689 g/mol
Appearance	Colorless crystalline platelets
Melting point	358 to 366 °C; 676 to 691 °F; 631 to 639 K
Solubility in water	soluble
Solubility in ethanol	soluble

Thermochemistry
Enthalpy of fusion (Δ_{f}H^{⦵}_{fus})	179 kJ/kg

Hazards
- GHS labelling
Pictograms	(GHS07: Exclamation mark)
Signal word	Warning
Hazard statements	H302, H317, H319
Precautionary statements	P261, P264, P264+P265, P270, P272, P280, P301+P317, P302+P352, P305+P351+P338, P321, P330, P333+P317, P337+P317, P362+P364, P501
- Except where otherwise noted, data are given for materials in their standard state (at 25 °C [77 °F], 100 kPa). verify (what is ?) Infobox references

Potassium propanoate or potassium propionate is a chemical compound with the chemical formula K(C_{2}H_{5}COO). It is the potassium salt of propanoic acid.

== Preparation ==
Potassium propanoate can be prepared by treating potassium carbonate with propanoic acid.

== Use ==
It is used as a food preservative and is represented by the food labeling E number E283 in Europe and by the INS number 283 in Australia and New Zealand.

== Reactions ==
Decomposition takes place via ketonization, yielding the symmetric ketone (3-pentanone) and potassium carbonate:

2K(O_{2}CEt) → K_{2}CO_{3} + Et(CO)Et
