= Ketonic decarboxylation =

Chemical reaction which converts two –COOH groups to >C=O

Ketonic decarboxylation (also known as decarboxylative ketonization) is a type of organic reaction involving decarboxylation, converting two equivalents of a carboxylic acid (R−C(=O)OH) to a symmetric ketone (R_{2}C=O). The reaction typically requires heat and a metal catalyst, and generally proceeds in low yields. It can be thought of as a decarboxylative Claisen condensation. Water and carbon dioxide are byproducts:

2 RCOOH → R_{2}CO + CO_{2} + H_{2}O

Bases promote this reaction. The reaction mechanism is proposed to involve nucleophilic attack of the alpha-carbon of one acid group on the other carboxylic acid group, possibly as a concerted reaction with the decarboxylation. The initial formation of an intermediate carbanion via decarboxylation of one of the acid groups prior to the nucleophilic attack is unlikely since the byproduct resulting from the carbanion's protonation by the acid has not been reported. This reaction is different from oxidative decarboxylation, which proceeds through a radical mechanism and is characterised by a different product distribution in isotopic labeling experiments with two different carboxylic acids.

With two different carboxylic acids the reaction has poor selectivity for the mixed product, unless one of the acids (for example, a small, volatile one) is used in large excess to minimise the loss of the other acid.

== Examples ==
The dry distillation of calcium acetate to give acetone was reported by Charles Friedel in 1858 and until World War I ketonization was the premier commercial method for its production.

Ketonic decarboxylation of propanoic acid over a manganese(II) oxide catalyst in a tube furnace affords 3-pentanone.

5-Nonanone, which is potentially of interest as a diesel fuel, can be produced from valeric acid. Stearone is prepared by heating magnesium stearate.

The processing of biomass often produces chemicals that are too oxygen-rich. Ketonic decarboxylation is one strategy to shift the C/O ratio.

=== Metal oxide catalysts ===
Dozens or more metal oxides have been investigated as catalysts for the decarboxylation. Early work focused on the oxides of calcium and thorium. Of commercial interest are related ketonizations using cerium(IV) oxide and manganese dioxide on alumina as the catalysts. The synthesis of 4-heptanone illustrates the production of the metal carboxylate in situ. Iron powder and butyric acid are converted to iron butyrate. Pyrolysis of that salt gives the ketone.

=== Intramolecular decarboxylations ===
The intramolecular version of ketonic decarboxylation is often called the Ružička large-ring synthesis (or Ružička cyclization), named for Lavoslav Ružička who developed the technique from prior methods that could synthesize small cyclic compounds from calcium salts of dicarboxylic acids. It was the first direct route to cyclic compounds with more than 8 members and was used by Ružička to produce macrocyclic molecules with up to 34 carbon atoms. One target for such reactions are the naturally occurring fragrances civetone and muscone. The method involved dry distillation of dibasic salts of a dicarboxylic acid, such as thorium, cerium, and yttrium salts, mixed with copper powder to improve heat transfer. This method was low-yielding for large ring sizes and was eventually supplanted by various methods using the high dilution principle.

The Ruzicka large-ring synthesis

A more conventional example of intramolecular ketonization is the conversion of adipic acid to cyclopentanone with barium hydroxide.
