= Trimethylphosphine oxide =

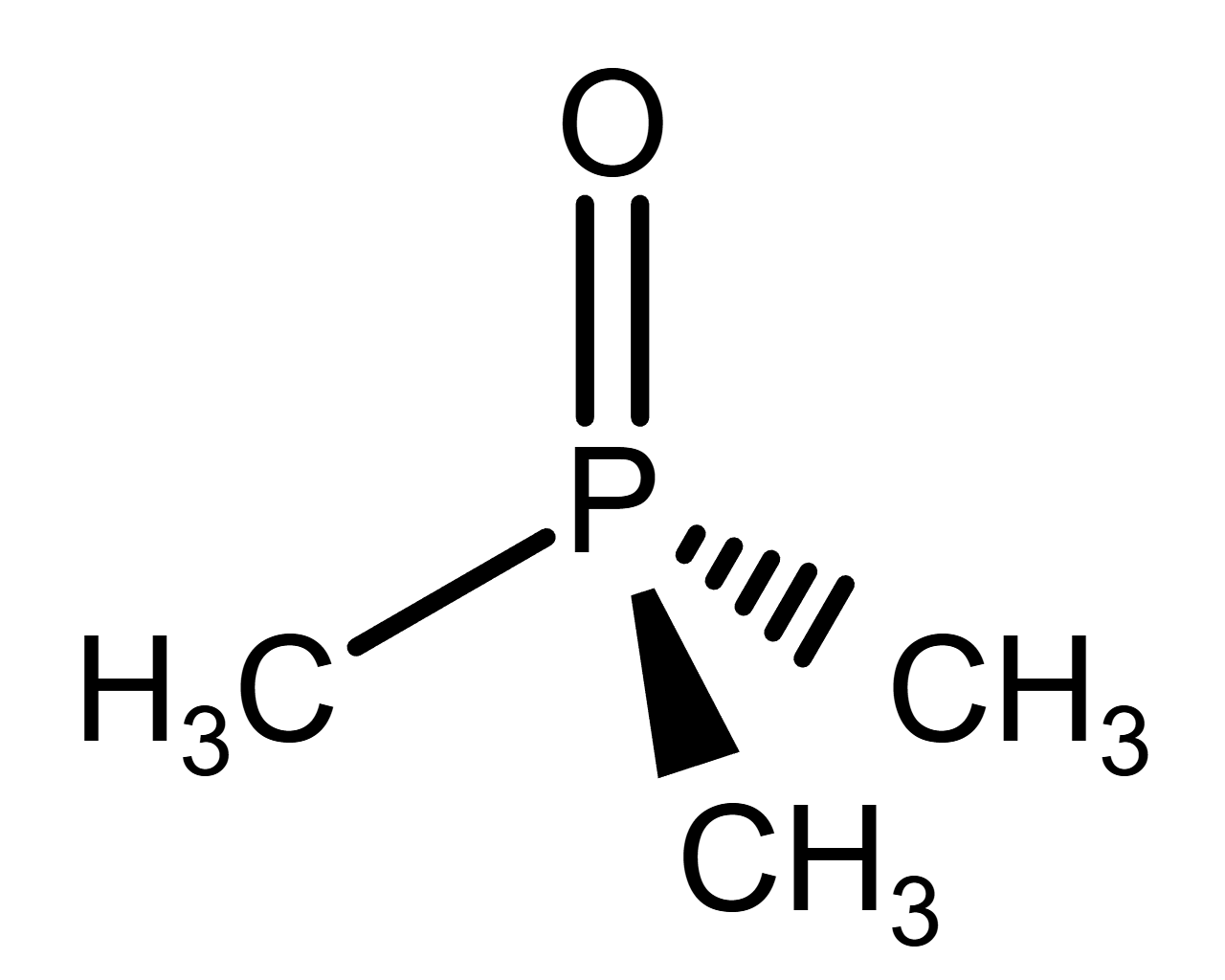

Names
- IUPAC name Dimethylphosphorylmethane
- Other names: Trimethylphosphine oxide; Trimethylphosphine P-oxide; Trimethylphosphane oxide; Trimethyl phosphone

Identifiers
CAS Number	676-96-0
3D model (JSmol)	Interactive image
Abbreviations	TMPO
ChEMBL	ChEMBL5189319
ChemSpider	62812
ECHA InfoCard	100.010.577
EC Number	211-633-9
PubChem CID	69609
UNII	4M39GK79DV
CompTox Dashboard (EPA)	DTXSID90217923
- InChI: InChI=1S/C3H9OP/c1-5(2,3)4/h1-3H3 Key: LRMLWYXJORUTBG-UHFFFAOYSA-N
- SMILES: CP(=O)(C)C

Properties
Chemical formula	(CH_{3})_{3}PO
Molar mass	92.078 g·mol^{−1}
Appearance	White crystalline solid
Odor	Odorless
Density	0.9 g/cm^{3}
Melting point	140–141 °C (284–286 °F; 413–414 K)
Boiling point	193.7 °C (380.7 °F; 466.8 K)
Solubility in water	Soluble
Solubility	Soluble in polar organic solvents.

Structure
Molecular shape	Tetrahedral at P

Hazards
- Occupational safety and health (OHS/OSH)
Main hazards	Serious eye irritation and damage
- GHS labelling
Pictograms	(GHS07: Exclamation mark)
Signal word	Warning
Hazard statements	H302, H315, H319, H335
Precautionary statements	P261, P264, P264+P265, P270, P271, P280, P301+P317, P302+P352, P304+P340, P305+P351+P338, P319, P321, P330, P332+P317, P337+P317, P362+P364, P403+P233, P405, P501
NFPA 704 (fire diamond)	2 1 0
Flash point	71 °C (160 °F)

Related compounds
Related compounds	Trimethylamine oxide; Dimethyl sulfone
- Except where otherwise noted, data are given for materials in their standard state (at 25 °C [77 °F], 100 kPa). Infobox references

Trimethylphosphine oxide is an organophosphorus compound with the chemical formula (CH_{3})_{3}PO. It forms highly hygroscopic, white, needle-shaped crystals. It forms a dihydrate (CH_{3})_{3}PO·2H_{2}O.

== Synthesis ==
Trimethylphosphine oxide can be obtained by reaction between phosphoryl chloride and the Grignard reagent methylmagnesium chloride.

POCl_{3} + 3 CH_{3}MgCl → (CH_{3})_{3}PO + 3 MgCl_{2}

Trimethylphosphine is easily oxidized by oxygen to trimethylphosphine oxide.

== Structure ==
Trimethylphosphine oxide molecule is tetrahedral at the phosphorus atom. It is a resonance between these two structures:

(CH_{3})_{3}P^{+}−O^{−} ↔ (CH_{3})_{3}P=O

The distances between atoms are as follows:

- C-H 110 pm
- P-C 181 pm
- P-O 148 pm

The angles between atoms are as follows:

- ∠C-P-O 112.3°
- ∠C-P-C 106.0°
- ∠P-C-H 109°
