= CYP4B1 =

Protein-coding gene in humans

Identifiers
- Aliases: CYP4B1, CYPIVB1, P-450HP, cytochrome P450 family 4 subfamily B member 1
- External IDs: OMIM: 124075; MGI: 103225; GeneCards: CYP4B1
Enzyme activity
EC #	BRENDA	ExPASy	KEGG	MetaCyc
1.14.14.1	↗	↗	↗	↗

Gene location (Human)
Chr.	Chromosome 1 (human)
Band	1p33	Start	46,757,838 bp
Band	1p33	End	46,819,413 bp

Gene location (Mouse)
Chr.	Chromosome 4 (mouse)
Band	4 D1|4 53.06 cM	Start	115,481,922 bp
Band	4 D1|4 53.06 cM	End	115,504,920 bp
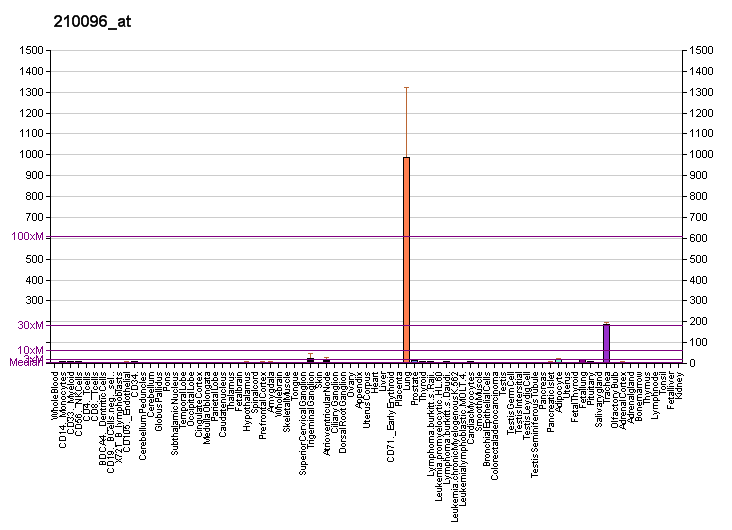
RNA expression pattern
Bgee	Human / Mouse (ortholog); Top expressed in: bronchial epithelial cell; right lung; nasal epithelium; mucosa of paranasal sinus; olfactory zone of nasal mucosa; lower lobe of lung; epithelium of nasopharynx; right uterine tube; upper lobe of lung; upper lobe of left lung / Top expressed in: right kidney; right lung lobe; superior surface of tongue; human kidney; Ileal epithelium; olfactory epithelium; mesenteric lymph nodes; left lung; trachea; cardiac muscle tissue of left ventricle; More reference expression data
BioGPS	More reference expression data
Gene ontology
Molecular function	iron ion binding; oxygen binding; metal ion binding; fluorene oxygenase activity; heme binding; oxidoreductase activity, acting on paired donors, with incorporation or reduction of molecular oxygen; oxidoreductase activity; aromatase activity; toxic substance binding; monooxygenase activity
Cellular component	organelle membrane; endoplasmic reticulum membrane; membrane; intracellular membrane-bounded organelle; endoplasmic reticulum
Biological process	biphenyl metabolic process; cellular aromatic compound metabolic process
Sources:Amigo / QuickGO
Orthologs
Databases	NCBI: entry; OMA: entry
Species	Human	Mouse
Entrez	1580	13120
Ensembl	ENSG00000142973	ENSMUSG00000028713
UniProt	P13584	Q64462
RefSeq (mRNA)	NM_000779; NM_001099772; NM_001319161; NM_001319162; NM_001319163	NM_007823
RefSeq (protein)	NP_000770; NP_001093242; NP_001306090; NP_001306091; NP_001306092	NP_031849
Location (UCSC)	Chr 1: 46.76 – 46.82 Mb	Chr 4: 115.48 – 115.5 Mb
PubMed search
- Wikidata
View/Edit Human	View/Edit Mouse

Cytochrome P450 4B1 is a protein that in humans is encoded by the CYP4B1 gene.

This gene encodes a member of the cytochrome P450 superfamily of enzymes. The cytochrome P450 proteins are monooxygenases which catalyze many reactions involved in drug metabolism and synthesis of cholesterol, steroids and other lipids. This protein localizes to the endoplasmic reticulum. In rodents, the homologous protein has been shown to metabolize certain carcinogens; however, the specific function of the human protein has not been determined.

Mouse Mutant Alleles for Cyp4b1
Marker Symbol for Mouse Gene. This symbol is assigned to the genomic locus by the MGI	Cyp4b1
Mutant Mouse Embryonic Stem Cell Clones. These are the known targeted mutations for this gene in a mouse.	CYP4B1^{tm1a(KOMP)Wtsi}
Example structure of targeted conditional mutant allele for this gene
Molecular structure of Cyp4b1 region with inserted mutation sequence
These Mutant ES Cells can be studied directly or used to generate mice with this gene knocked out. Study of these mice can shed light on the function of Cyp4b1: see Knockout mouse
