= Methyl isopropyl ketone =

Chemical compound (C5H10O)

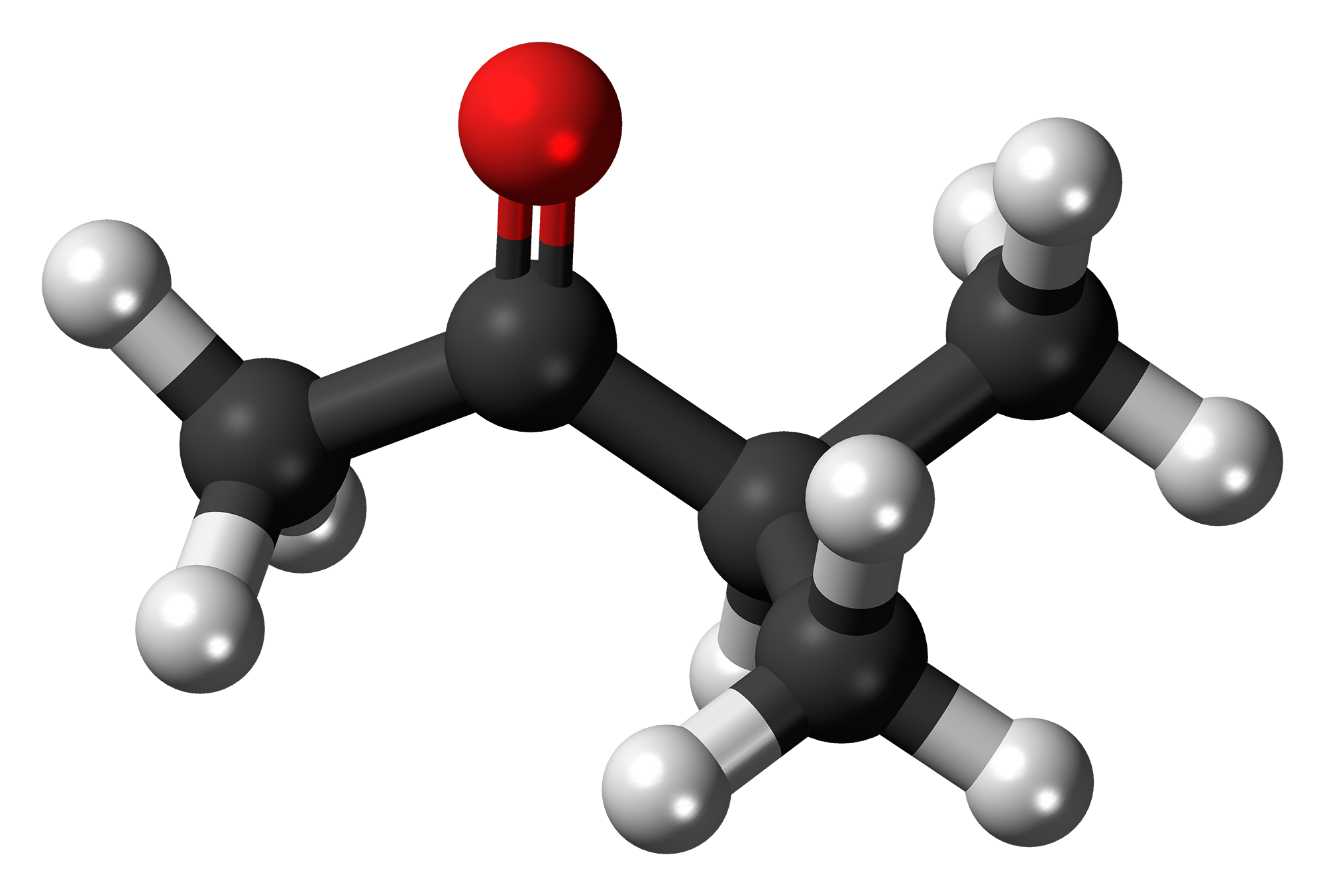

Names
- Preferred IUPAC name 3-Methylbutan-2-one
- Other names Isopropyl methyl ketone, MIPK, 2-Acetyl propane 3-Methyl-2-butanone

Identifiers
CAS Number	563-80-4
3D model (JSmol)	Interactive image
ChemSpider	10777
ECHA InfoCard	100.008.423
EC Number	209-264-3
PubChem CID	11251
UNII	V8DP6THY5O
CompTox Dashboard (EPA)	DTXSID0022062
- InChI: InChI=1S/C5H10O/c1-4(2)5(3)6/h4H,1-3H3 Key: SYBYTAAJFKOIEJ-UHFFFAOYSA-N; InChI=1/C5H10O/c1-4(2)5(3)6/h4H,1-3H3 Key: SYBYTAAJFKOIEJ-UHFFFAOYAE
- SMILES: CC(C)C(=O)C

Properties
Chemical formula	C_{5}H_{10}O
Molar mass	86.13 g/mol
Appearance	Colorless liquid
Odor	Acetone-like
Density	0.803 g/cm^{3} (20 °C)
Melting point	−92 °C (−134 °F; 181 K)
Boiling point	92 °C (198 °F; 365 K)
Solubility in water	6-8.2 g/L (20 °C)
Vapor pressure	8.6 kPa (20 °C)
Magnetic susceptibility (χ)	−58.45·10^{−6} cm^{3}/mol
Refractive index (n_{D})	1.389 (20 °C)
Viscosity	0.48 mPa·s (20 °C)

Hazards
Flash point	5 °C (41 °F)
Autoignition temperature	475 °C (887 °F; 748 K)
- NIOSH (US health exposure limits)
PEL (Permissible)	none
REL (Recommended)	TWA 200 ppm (705 mg/m^{3})
IDLH (Immediate danger)	N.D.
- Except where otherwise noted, data are given for materials in their standard state (at 25 °C [77 °F], 100 kPa). verify (what is ?) Infobox references

3-Methyl-2-butanone (methyl isopropyl ketone, MIPK) is a ketone and solvent of minor importance. It is comparable to MEK (Methyl ethyl ketone), but has a lower solvency and is more expensive.
