= 5-Nonanone =

Names
- Preferred IUPAC name Nonan-5-one
- Other names Dibutyl ketone; n-Butylketone

Identifiers
CAS Number	502-56-7
3D model (JSmol)	Interactive image
Beilstein Reference	1743583
ChemSpider	9976
ECHA InfoCard	100.007.224
EC Number	207-946-5
MeSH	5-nonanone
PubChem CID	10405
UNII	V8B2Y1BZ3S
UN number	1224
CompTox Dashboard (EPA)	DTXSID7022045
- InChI: InChI=1S/C9H18O/c1-3-5-7-9(10)8-6-4-2/h3-8H2,1-2H3 Key: WSGCRAOTEDLMFQ-UHFFFAOYSA-N
- SMILES: CCCCC(=O)CCCC

Properties
Chemical formula	C_{9}H_{18}O
Molar mass	142.242 g·mol^{−1}
Appearance	Colorless
Density	0.82 g/mL
Melting point	−4 °C; 25 °F; 269 K
Boiling point	188.5 °C; 371.2 °F; 461.6 K
log P	2.88
Vapor pressure	0.073 kPa (at 25.0 °C)

Hazards
- GHS labelling
Pictograms	(GHS02: Flammable) (GHS07: Exclamation mark) (GHS08: Health hazard)
Signal word	Danger
Hazard statements	H226, H319, H335, H336, H372
Precautionary statements	P210, P233, P240, P241, P242, P243, P260, P264, P270, P271, P280, P303+P361+P353, P304+P340, P305+P351+P338, P312, P314, P337+P313, P370+P378, P403+P233, P403+P235, P405, P501
- Except where otherwise noted, data are given for materials in their standard state (at 25 °C [77 °F], 100 kPa). Infobox references

5-Nonanone, or dibutyl ketone, is the organic compound with the formula (CH_{3}CH_{2}CH_{2}CH_{2})_{2}CO. This colorless liquid is a symmetrical ketone.

== Synthesis ==
5-Nonanone, which is potentially of interest as a diesel fuel, can be produced from levulinic acid, which can be produced from fructose. Levulinic acid is converted to valeric acid, which undergoes ketonization.

== Toxicology ==
=== Metabolic pathway ===
5-Nonanone was expected to be metabolized to a γ-diketone (a diketone with the second oxygen three carbons away from the first, e.g. 2,5- or 3,6-diketones).

Metabolic studies confirmed the in vivo ω-oxidation of 5-nonanone to 2,5-nonanedione and 2-hexanone. Subsequent oxidative and decarboxylative steps also produce 2,5-hexanedione. Besides these metabolites, 38% of the 5-nonanone dose is converted to carbon dioxide. No unchanged 5-nonanone is detected in the urine after administration.

Of these metabolites, 2,5-hexanedione is believed to be the most neurotoxic compound. Of all the aforementioned metabolites, the toxicity is believed to be due to the metabolic transformation to this γ-diketone.

=== Toxicological effects ===
In rats, the neurotoxicity of 5-nonanone is enhanced by methyl ethyl ketone. This suggests induction of microsomal oxidizing enzymes, which results in greater production of toxic metabolites. Chronic exposure to the compound has been shown to produce a clinical neuropathy, characterized by giant axonal swellings filled with neurofilaments. It also resulted in an orange/brown discoloration of the hair of the rats.

Another study was done on rats to explore the enhancement of the toxicity of 5-nonanone by 5-methyl-2-octanone. The combination of these two compounds increases the neurotoxic effect of 5-nonanone approximately sixfold. When only exposed to 5-methyl-2-octanone liver swelling was observed, indicating that metabolic activation of hepatic oxidative enzymes may be the cause of the increase in toxicity in co-administration.

== See also ==
- Higher alkanes
- Ketones
