= Ethylmethylamine =

Names
- Preferred IUPAC name N-Methylethanamine
- Other names Ethyl(methyl)amine

Identifiers
CAS Number	624-78-2
3D model (JSmol)	Interactive image
Abbreviations	EMA; MeNHEt; EtNHMe
ChemSpider	11718
ECHA InfoCard	100.009.875
EC Number	210-862-1
PubChem CID	12219
UNII	AE3IIW7JBO
CompTox Dashboard (EPA)	DTXSID8060793
- InChI: InChI=1S/C3H9N/c1-3-4-2/h4H,3H2,1-2H3 Key: LIWAQLJGPBVORC-UHFFFAOYSA-N
- SMILES: CCNC

Properties
Chemical formula	C_{3}H_{9}N
Molar mass	59.112 g·mol^{−1}
Appearance	Colorless liquid
Density	688 kg m^{−3} (at 25 °C)
Melting point	-70.99°C (estimate)
Boiling point	36 to 37 °C (97 to 99 °F; 309 to 310 K)
Solubility in water	significantly soluble in water

Hazards
- Occupational safety and health (OHS/OSH)
Main hazards	Corrosive; Highly flammable
- GHS labelling
Pictograms	(GHS02: Flammable) (GHS05: Corrosive) (GHS06: Toxic) (GHS07: Exclamation mark)
Signal word	Danger
Hazard statements	H224, H225, H302, H311, H312, H314, H332, H335
Precautionary statements	P210, P233, P240, P241, P242, P243, P260, P264, P270, P271, P280, P301+P312, P301+P330+P331, P302+P352, P303+P361+P353, P304+P312, P304+P340, P305+P351+P338, P310, P312, P321, P322, P330, P361, P363, P370+P378, P403+P233, P403+P235, P405, P501
- Except where otherwise noted, data are given for materials in their standard state (at 25 °C [77 °F], 100 kPa). Infobox references

Ethylmethylamine, or N-methylethanamine, is a compound with the chemical formula C_{3}H_{9}N. It is corrosive and highly flammable.
