= 3-Pentanone =

- Skeletal formula of 3-pentanone

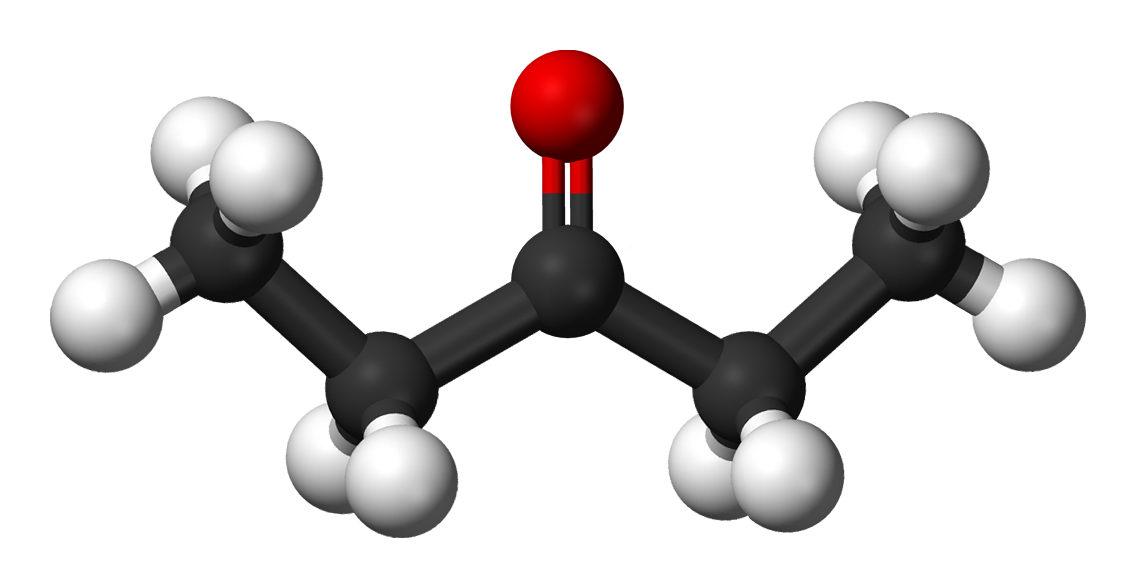
- Ball-and-stick model of 3-pentanone

Names
- Preferred IUPAC name Pentan-3-one
- Other names Diethyl ketone, diethylketone, 3-pentanone, dimethyl acetone, propione, DEK, metacetone, methacetone, ethyl ketone fraction

Identifiers
CAS Number	96-22-0
3D model (JSmol)	Interactive image
ChEBI	CHEBI:87755
ChEMBL	ChEMBL45315
ChemSpider	7016
ECHA InfoCard	100.002.265
EC Number	202-490-3
PubChem CID	7288
RTECS number	SA8050000
UNII	9SLZ98M9NK
UN number	1156
CompTox Dashboard (EPA)	DTXSID6021820
- InChI: InChI=1S/C5H10O/c1-3-5(6)4-2/h3-4H2,1-2H3 Key: FDPIMTJIUBPUKL-UHFFFAOYSA-N; InChI=1/C5H10O/c1-3-5(6)4-2/h3-4H2,1-2H3 Key: FDPIMTJIUBPUKL-UHFFFAOYAJ
- SMILES: O=C(CC)CC

Properties
Chemical formula	C_{5}H_{10}O
Molar mass	86.134 g·mol^{−1}
Appearance	Colorless liquid
Odor	Acetone-like
Density	0.81 g/cm^{3} at 20 °C
Melting point	−39 °C (−38 °F; 234 K)
Boiling point	102 °C (216 °F; 375 K)
Solubility in water	35 g/L
Vapor pressure	35 mmHg
Magnetic susceptibility (χ)	−58.14·10^{−6} cm^{3}/mol

Hazards
- GHS labelling
Pictograms	(GHS02: Flammable) (GHS07: Exclamation mark)
Signal word	Danger
Hazard statements	H225, H335, H336
Precautionary statements	P210, P233, P240, P241, P242, P243, P261, P271, P280, P303+P361+P353, P304+P340, P312, P370+P378, P403+P233, P403+P235, P405, P501
Flash point	12.78 °C (55.00 °F; 285.93 K)
Autoignition temperature	425 °C (797 °F; 698 K)
Explosive limits	1.6–6.4%
- NIOSH (US health exposure limits)
PEL (Permissible)	none
REL (Recommended)	TWA 200 ppm (705 mg/m^{3})
IDLH (Immediate danger)	N.D.
- Except where otherwise noted, data are given for materials in their standard state (at 25 °C [77 °F], 100 kPa). verify (what is ?) Infobox references

3-Pentanone (also known as diethyl ketone) is a simple, symmetrical dialkyl ketone. It is a colorless liquid ketone with an odor like that of acetone. It is soluble in about 25 parts water, but miscible with organic solvents.

== Uses ==
3-Pentanone is primarily used as starting material in chemical synthesis. A major application is in the industrial synthesis of vitamin E. It has also been used in the synthesis of Oseltamivir (Tamiflu).

3-Pentanone itself finds some use as a specialty solvent in paint, although it is less common than butanone.

== Syntheses ==
=== Ketonic decarboxylation route ===
3-Pentanone is produced by ketonic decarboxylation of propanoic acid using metal oxide catalysts:

2 CH_{3}CH_{2}CO_{2}H → (CH_{3}CH_{2})_{2}CO + CO_{2} + H_{2}O

in the laboratory, the reaction can be conducted in a tube furnace.

=== Carbonylation route ===
It can also be prepared by combining ethylene, CO, and H_{2}. When the reaction is catalyzed by dicobalt octacarbonyl, water can be used as a source of hydrogen. A proposed intermediate is the ethylene-propionyl species [CH_{3}C(O)Co(CO)_{3}(ethylene)] which undergoes a migratory insertion to form [CH_{3}COCH_{2}CH_{2}Co(CO)_{3}]. The required hydrogen arises from the water shift reaction. For details, see If the water shift reaction is not operative, the reaction affords a polymer containing alternating carbon monoxide and ethylene units. Such aliphatic polyketones are more conventionally prepared using palladium catalysts.

== Safety ==
The TLV value for 3-pentanone is 200 ppm (705 mg/m^{3}). 3-pentanone can be hazardous if it comes in contact with the skin or eyes, and can cause irritation of the skin and redness, watering, and itching of the eyes. This chemical can also cause nervous system or organ damage if ingested. Although considered stable, 3-pentanone is extremely flammable if exposed to flame, sparks, or another source of heat. For safety, it should be stored in a flammable materials cabinet away from heat or sources of ignition, preferably in a cool, well-ventilated area.

== See also ==
- 2-Pentanone
- Methyl isopropyl ketone
