= 2-Pentanone =

- Skeletal formula of 2-pentanone

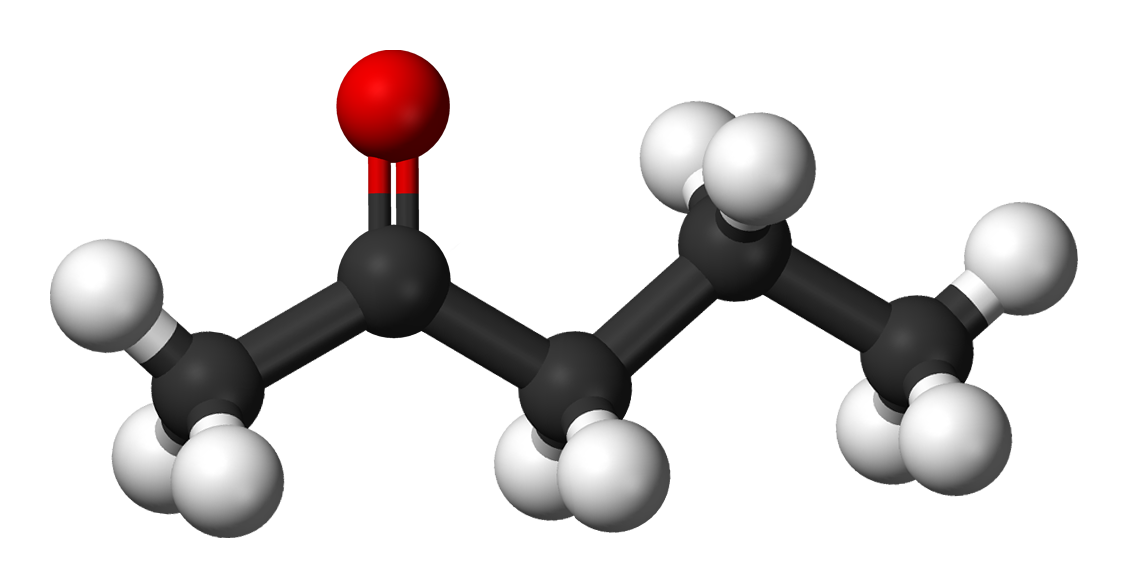
- Ball-and-stick model of 2-pentanone

Names
- Preferred IUPAC name Pentan-2-one
- Other names methyl propyl ketone 2-pentanone MPK

Identifiers
| CAS Number | 107-87-9 |
| 3D model (JSmol) | Interactive image |
| ChEBI | CHEBI:16472 |
| ChEMBL | ChEMBL45345 |
| ChemSpider | 7607 |
| ECHA InfoCard | 100.003.208 |
| KEGG | C01949 |
| PubChem CID | 7895 |
| RTECS number | CY1400000 |
| UNII | I97392I10V |
| CompTox Dashboard (EPA) | DTXSID0021888 |
- InChI: InChI=1S/C5H10O/c1-3-4-5(2)6/h3-4H2,1-2H3 Key: XNLICIUVMPYHGG-UHFFFAOYSA-N; InChI=1/C5H10O/c1-3-4-5(2)6/h3-4H2,1-2H3 Key: XNLICIUVMPYHGG-UHFFFAOYAJ
- SMILES: O=C(C)CCC

Properties
| Chemical formula | C_{5}H_{10}O |
| Molar mass | 86.13 g/mol |
| Appearance | Colorless liquid |
| Odor | resembling acetone |
| Density | 0.8062 g/ml (20 °C) |
| Melting point | −78 °C (−108 °F; 195 K) |
| Boiling point | 102 °C (216 °F; 375 K) |
| Solubility in water | 6% (20°C) |
| Vapor pressure | 3.6 kPa (20 °C) |
| Magnetic susceptibility (χ) | −57.41·10^{−6} cm^{3}/mol |
| Refractive index (n_{D}) | 1.3903 (20 °C) |
| Viscosity | 0.50 mPa·s (20 °C) |

Hazards
| Flash point | 10 °C (50 °F; 283 K) |
| Explosive limits | 1.5–8.2% |
- Lethal dose or concentration (LD, LC)
| LD_{50} (median dose) | 1600 mg/kg (rat, oral); 1600 mg/kg (mouse, oral) |
| LC_{Lo} (lowest published) | 50,000 ppm (guinea pig, 50 min); 13,000 ppm (guinea pig, 5 hr) |
- NIOSH (US health exposure limits)
| PEL (Permissible) | TWA 200 ppm (700 mg/m^{3}) |
| REL (Recommended) | TWA 150 ppm (530 mg/m^{3}) |
| IDLH (Immediate danger) | 1500 ppm |
- Except where otherwise noted, data are given for materials in their standard state (at 25 °C [77 °F], 100 kPa). verify (what is ?) Infobox references

2-Pentanone or methyl propyl ketone (MPK) is a ketone and solvent of minor importance. It is comparable to methyl ethyl ketone, but has a lower solvency and is more expensive. It occurs naturally in Nicotiana tabacum (Tobacco) and blue cheese as a metabolic product of Penicillium mold growth.
