= Propionic acid =

Carboxylic acid with chemical formula CH_{3}CH_{2}CO_{2}H

Simplified skeletal formula
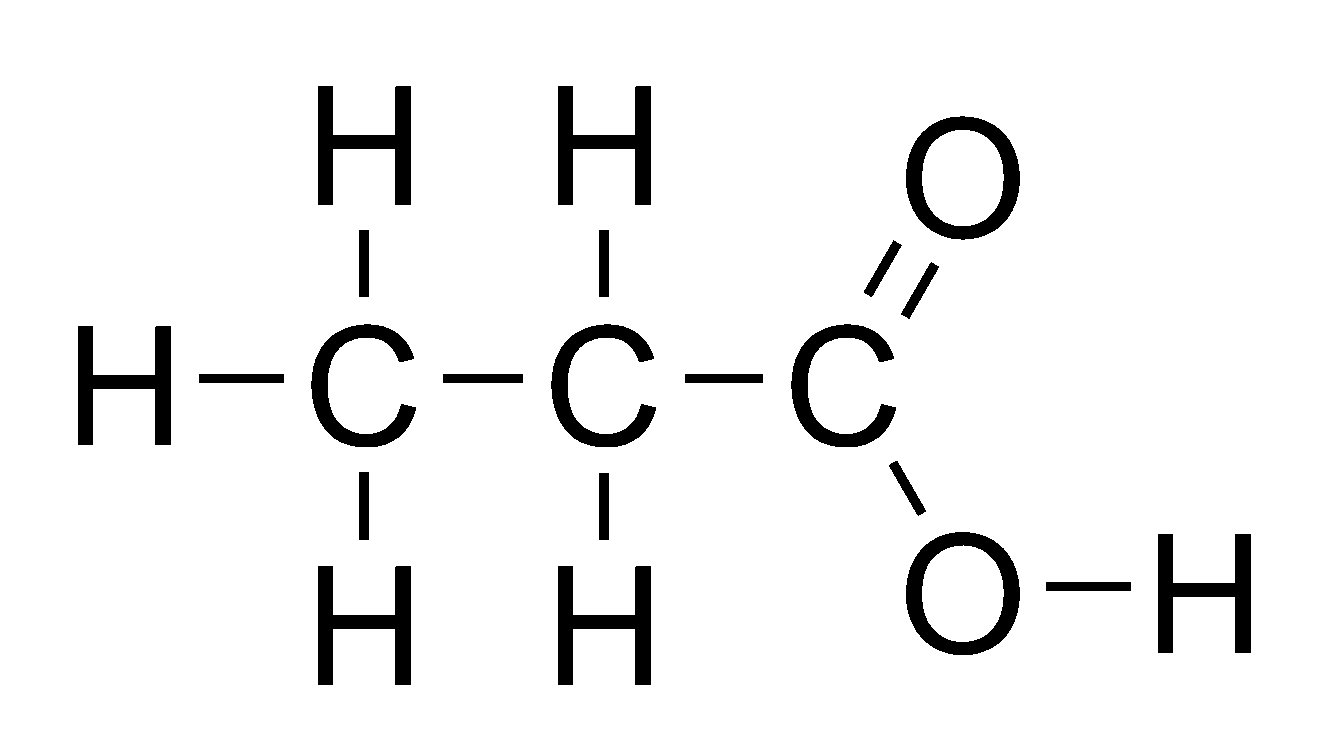
Full structural formula
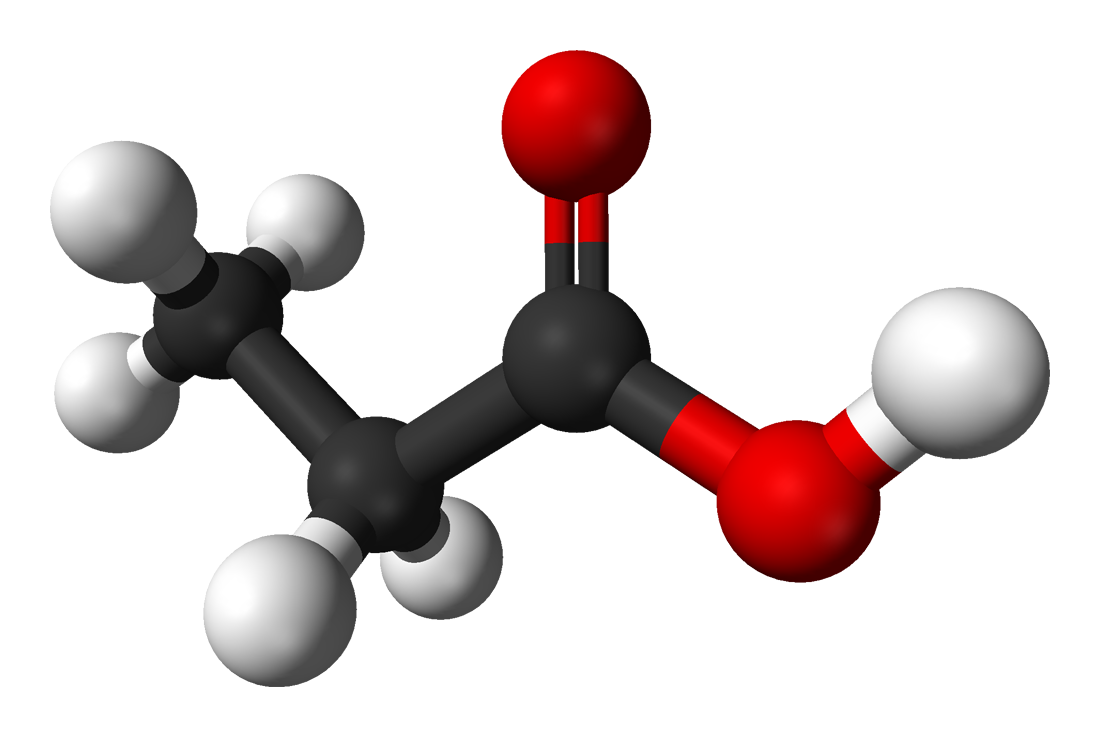
Ball-and-stick model
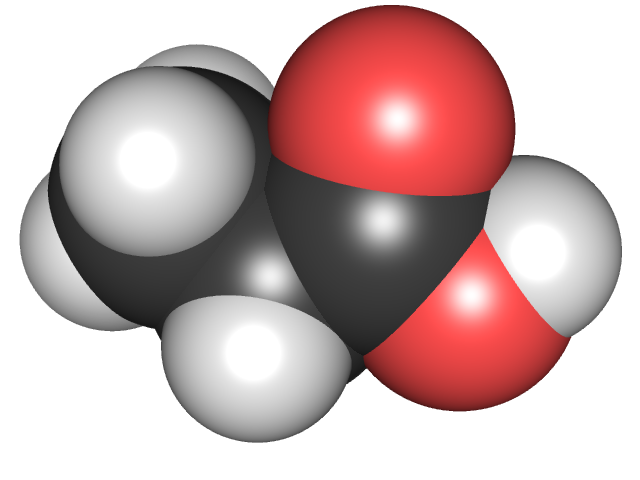
Space-filling model
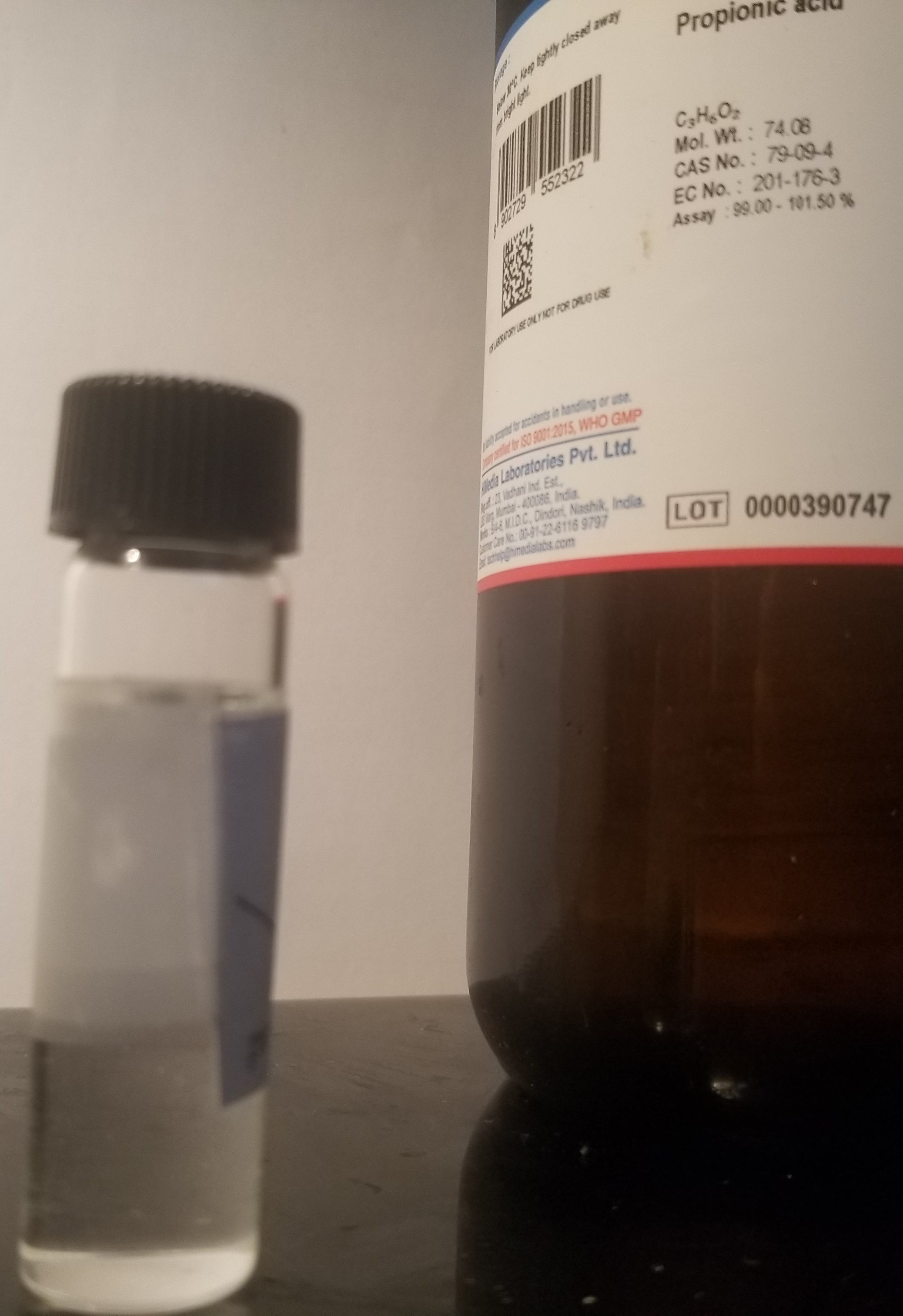

Names
- Preferred IUPAC name Propanoic acid
- Other names Carboxyethane; Ethanecarboxylic acid Ethylformic acid Metacetonic acid Methylacetic acid C3:0 (Lipid numbers)

Identifiers
CAS Number	Propionic acid: 79-09-4; Propionate: 72-03-7
3D model (JSmol)	Propionic acid: Interactive image; Propionate: Interactive image
ChEBI	Propionic acid: CHEBI:30768
ChEMBL	Propionic acid: ChEMBL14021
ChemSpider	Propionic acid: 1005; Propionate: 94556
DrugBank	Propionic acid: DB03766
ECHA InfoCard	100.001.070
EC Number	Propionic acid: 201-176-3
E number	E280 (preservatives)
IUPHAR/BPS	Propionic acid: 1062
PubChem CID	Propionic acid: 1032; Propionate: 104745
RTECS number	Propionic acid: UE5950000
UNII	Propionic acid: JHU490RVYR; Propionate: AKW5EM890C
CompTox Dashboard (EPA)	Propionic acid: DTXSID201058721 DTXSID8025961, DTXSID201058721
- InChI: InChI=1S/C3H6O2/c1-2-3(4)5/h2H2,1H3,(H,4,5) Key: XBDQKXXYIPTUBI-UHFFFAOYSA-N
- SMILES: Propionic acid: CCC(=O)O; Propionate: CCC(=O)[O-]

Properties
Chemical formula	C_{3}H_{6}O_{2}
Molar mass	74.079 g·mol^{−1}
Appearance	Colorless, oily liquid
Odor	Pungent, rancid, unpleasant
Density	0.98797 g/cm^{3}
Melting point	−20.5 °C (−4.9 °F; 252.7 K)
Boiling point	141.15 °C (286.07 °F; 414.30 K)
Sublimation conditions	Sublimes at −48 °C; Δ_{subl}H^{~~o~~} = 74 kJ/mol
Solubility in water	Miscible
Solubility	Miscible in ethanol, ether, CHCl_{3}
log P	0.33
Vapor pressure	0.32 kPa (20 °C); 0.47 kPa (25 °C); 9.62 kPa (100 °C)
Henry's law constant (k_{H})	4.45·10^{−4} L·atm/mol
Acidity (pK_{a})	4.88
Magnetic susceptibility (χ)	−43.50·10^{−6} cm^{3}/mol
Refractive index (n_{D})	1.3843
Viscosity	1.175 cP (15 °C); 1.02 cP (25 °C); 0.668 cP (60 °C); 0.495 cP (90 °C)

Structure
Crystal structure	Monoclinic (−95 °C)
Space group	P2_{1}/c
Lattice constant	a = 4.04 Å, b = 9.06 Å, c = 11 Å α = 90°, β = 91.25°, γ = 90°
Dipole moment	0.63 D (22 °C)

Thermochemistry
Heat capacity (C)	152.8 J/mol·K
Std molar entropy (S^{⦵}_{298})	191 J/mol·K
Std enthalpy of formation (Δ_{f}H^{⦵}_{298})	−510.8 kJ/mol
Std enthalpy of combustion (Δ_{c}H^{⦵}_{298})	1527.3 kJ/mol

Hazards
- Occupational safety and health (OHS/OSH)
Main hazards	Corrosive
- GHS labelling
Pictograms	(GHS02: Flammable) (GHS05: Corrosive) (GHS07: Exclamation mark)
Signal word	Danger
Hazard statements	H314
Precautionary statements	P280, P305+P351+P338, P310
NFPA 704 (fire diamond)	3 2 0
Flash point	54 °C (129 °F; 327 K)
Autoignition temperature	512 °C (954 °F; 785 K)
- Lethal dose or concentration (LD, LC)
LD_{50} (median dose)	1370 mg/kg (mouse, oral)
- NIOSH (US health exposure limits)
PEL (Permissible)	none
REL (Recommended)	TWA 10 ppm (30 mg/m^{3}) ST 15 ppm (45 mg/m^{3})
IDLH (Immediate danger)	N.D.

Related compounds
Related carboxylic acids	Acetic acid; Lactic acid; 3-Hydroxypropionic acid; Tartronic acid; Acrylic acid; Butyric acid
Related compounds	1-Propanol; Propionaldehyde; Sodium propionate; Propionic anhydride
- Except where otherwise noted, data are given for materials in their standard state (at 25 °C [77 °F], 100 kPa). Infobox references

Propionic acid (/proʊpiˈɒnɪk/, from the Greek words πρῶτος, prōtos, meaning "first", and πίων, píōn, meaning "fat"; also known as propanoic acid) is a naturally occurring carboxylic acid with chemical formula CH_{3}CH_{2}CO_{2}H. It is an oily liquid with a pungent and unpleasant smell. The anion CH_{3}CH_{2}CO^{−}_{2} as well as the salts and esters of propionic acid are known as propionates or propanoates. Propionic acid is the third simplest carboxylic acid, with the first two being formic acid and acetic acid.

About half of the world production of propionic acid is consumed as a preservative for both animal feed and food for human consumption. It is also useful as an intermediate in the production of other chemicals, especially polymers.

== History ==
Propionic acid was first described in 1844 by Johann Gottlieb, who found it among the degradation products of sugar. Over the next few years, other chemists produced propionic acid by different means, none of them realizing they were producing the same substance. In 1847, French chemist Jean-Baptiste Dumas established all the acids to be the same compound, which he called propionic acid, from the Greek words πρῶτος, prōtos), meaning first, and πίων, piōn, meaning fat, because it is the smallest H(CH_{2})_{n}COOH acid that exhibits the properties of the other fatty acids, such as producing an oily layer when salted out of water and having a soapy potassium salt.

== Properties ==
Propionic acid has physical properties intermediate between those of the smaller carboxylic acids, formic and acetic acids, and the larger fatty acids. It is miscible with water, but can be removed from water by adding salt. As with acetic and formic acids, it consists of hydrogen bonded pairs of molecules in both the liquid and the vapor.

Propionic acid displays the general properties of carboxylic acids: it can form amide, ester, anhydride, and chloride derivatives. It undergoes the Hell–Volhard–Zelinsky reaction that involves α-halogenation of a carboxylic acid with bromine, catalysed by phosphorus tribromide, in this case to form 2-bromopropanoic acid, CH_{3}CHBrCOOH. This product has been used to prepare a racemic mixture of alanine by ammonolysis.

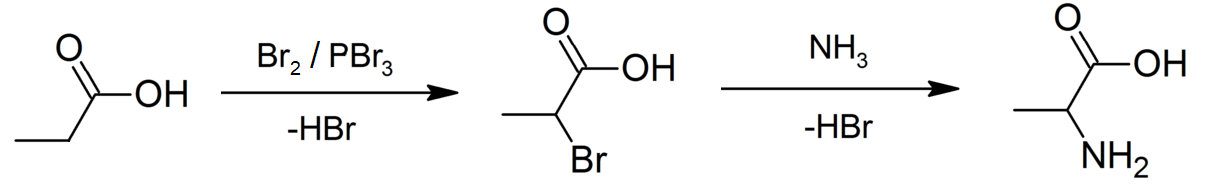

== Manufacture ==
=== Chemical ===
In industry, propionic acid is mainly produced by the hydrocarboxylation of ethylene using nickel carbonyl as the catalyst:

It is also produced by the aerobic oxidation of propionaldehyde. In the presence of cobalt or manganese salts (manganese propionate is most commonly used), this reaction proceeds rapidly at temperatures as mild as 40–50 °C:

Large amounts of propionic acid were once produced as a byproduct of acetic acid manufacture. At the current time, the world's largest producer of propionic acid is BASF, with approximately 150 kt/a production capacity.

=== Biotechnological ===
Biotechnological production of propionic acid mainly uses Propionibacterium strains. However, large scale production of propionic acid by Propionibacteria faces challenges such as severe inhibition of end-products during cell growth and the formation of by-products (acetic acid and succinic acid). One approach to improve productivity and yield during fermentation is through the use of cell immobilization techniques, which also promotes easy recovery, reuse of the cell biomass and enhances microorganisms' stress tolerance. In 2018, 3D printing technology was used for the first time to create a matrix for cell immobilization in fermentation. Propionic acid production by Propionibacterium acidipropionici immobilized on 3D-printed nylon beads was chosen as a model study. It was shown that those 3D-printed beads were able to promote high density cell attachment and propionic acid production, which could be adapted to other fermentation bioprocesses. Other cell immobilization matrices have been tested, such as recycled-glass Poraver and fibrous-bed bioreactor.

Alternative methods of production have been trialled, by genetically engineering strains of Escherichia coli to incorporate the necessary pathway, the Wood-Werkman cycle.

== Industrial uses ==
Propionic acid inhibits the growth of mold and some bacteria at levels between 0.1 and 1% by weight. As a result, some propionic acid produced is consumed as a preservative for both animal feed and food for human consumption. For animal feed, it is used either directly or as its ammonium salt. This application accounts for about half of the world production of propionic acid. The antibiotic monensin is added to cattle feed to favor propionibacteria over acetic acid producers in the rumen; this produces less carbon dioxide and feed conversion is better. Another major application is as a preservative in baked goods, which use the sodium and calcium salts. As a food additive, it is approved for use in the EU, US, Australia and New Zealand.

Propionic acid is also useful as an intermediate in the production of other chemicals, especially polymers. Cellulose-acetate-propionate is a useful thermoplastic. Vinyl propionate is also used. In more specialized applications, it is also used to make pesticides and pharmaceuticals. The esters of propionic acid have fruit-like odors and are sometimes used as solvents or artificial flavorings.

In biogas plants, propionic acid is a common intermediate product, which is formed by fermentation with propionic acid bacteria. Its degradation in anaerobic environments (e.g. biogas plants) requires the activity of complex microbial communities.

In production of Jarlsberg cheese, a propionic acid bacterium is used to give both taste and holes.

== Biology ==
Propionic acid is produced biologically as its coenzyme A ester, propionyl-CoA, from the metabolic breakdown of fatty acids containing odd numbers of carbon atoms, and also from the breakdown of some amino acids. Bacteria of the genus Propionibacterium produce propionic acid as the end-product of their anaerobic metabolism. This class of bacteria is commonly found in the stomachs of ruminants and the sweat glands of humans, and their activity is partially responsible for the odor of Emmental cheese, American "Swiss cheese" and sweat.

The metabolism of propionic acid begins with its conversion to propionyl coenzyme A, the usual first step in the metabolism of carboxylic acids. Since propionic acid has three carbons, propionyl-CoA cannot directly enter either beta oxidation or the citric acid cycles. In most vertebrates, propionyl-CoA is carboxylated to D-methylmalonyl-CoA, which is isomerised to L-methylmalonyl-CoA. A vitamin B_{12}-dependent enzyme catalyzes rearrangement of L-methylmalonyl-CoA to succinyl-CoA, which is an intermediate of the citric acid cycle and can be readily incorporated there.

Propionic acid serves as a substrate for hepatic gluconeogenesis via conversion to succinyl-CoA. Additionally, exogenous propionic acid administration results in more endogenous glucose production than can be accounted for by gluconeogenic conversion alone. Exogenous propionic acid may upregulate endogenous glucose production via increases in norepinephrine and glucagon, suggesting that chronic ingestion of propionic acid may have adverse metabolic consequences.

In propionic acidemia, a rare inherited genetic disorder, propionate acts as a metabolic toxin in liver cells by accumulating in mitochondria as propionyl-CoA and its derivative, methylcitrate, two tricarboxylic acid cycle inhibitors. Propanoate is metabolized oxidatively by glia, which suggests astrocytic vulnerability in propionic acidemia when intramitochondrial propionyl-CoA may accumulate. Propionic acidemia may alter both neuronal and glial gene expression by affecting histone acetylation. When propionic acid is infused directly into rodents' brains, it produces reversible behavior (e.g., hyperactivity, dystonia, social impairment, perseveration) and brain changes (e.g., innate neuroinflammation, glutathione depletion) that may be used as a means to model autism in rats.

=== Human occurrence ===
The human skin is host of several species of Propionibacteria. The most notable one is the Cutibacterium acnes (formerly known as Propionibacterium acnes), which lives mainly in the sebaceous glands of the skin and is one of the principal causes of acne. Propionate is observed to be among the most common short-chain fatty acids produced in the large intestine of humans by gut microbiota in response to indigestible carbohydrates (dietary fiber) in the diet. The role of the gut microbiota and their metabolites, including propionate, in mediating brain function has been reviewed.

A study in mice suggests that propionate is produced by the bacteria of the genus Bacteroides in the gut, and that it offers some protection against Salmonella there. Another study finds that fatty acid propionate can calm the immune cells that drive up blood pressure, thereby protecting the body from damaging effects of high blood pressure.

=== Bacteriology ===
The Bacteria species Coprothermobacter platensis produces propionate when fermenting gelatin. Prevotella brevis and Prevotella ruminicola also generate propionate when fermenting glucose.

== Propionate salts and esters ==
The propionate /ˈproʊpiəneɪt/, or propanoate, ion is C_{2}H_{5}COO^{−}, the conjugate base of propionic acid. It is the form found in biological systems at physiological pH. A propionic, or propanoic, compound is a carboxylate salt or ester of propionic acid. In these compounds, propionate is often written in shorthand, as CH_{3}CH_{2}CO_{2} or simply EtCO_{2}.

Propionates should not be confused with propenoates (commonly known as acrylates), the ions/salts/esters of propenoic acid (also known as 2-propenoic acid or acrylic acid).

=== Examples ===
==== Salts ====
- Sodium propionate NaC_{2}H_{5}CO_{2}
- Potassium propionate KC_{2}H_{5}CO_{2}
- Calcium propionate Ca(C_{2}H_{5}CO_{2})_{2}
- Zirconium propionate Zr(C_{2}H_{5}CO_{2})_{4}

==== Esters ====
- Methyl propionate C_{2}H_{5}(CO)OCH_{3}
- Ethyl propionate C_{2}H_{5}(CO)OC_{2}H_{5}
- Propyl propionate C_{2}H_{5}(CO)OC_{3}H_{7}
- Pentyl propionate C_{2}H_{5}(CO)OC_{5}H_{11}
- Fluticasone propionate C_{25}H_{31}F_{3}O_{5}S

== See also ==
- List of saturated fatty acids
- List of carboxylic acids
