= Hexatriacontylic acid =

36-Carbon fatty acid

Names
- Preferred IUPAC name Hexatriacontanoic acid
- Other names C36:0 (Lipid numbers)

Identifiers
CAS Number	4299-38-1
3D model (JSmol)	Interactive image
ChemSpider	4445723
PubChem CID	5282596
UNII	WZH710M27F
CompTox Dashboard (EPA)	DTXSID70195614
- InChI: InChI=1S/C36H72O2/c1-2-3-4-5-6-7-8-9-10-11-12-13-14-15-16-17-18-19-20-21-22-23-24-25-26-27-28-29-30-31-32-33-34-35-36(37)38/h2-35H2,1H3,(H,37,38) Key: LRKATBAZQAWAGV-UHFFFAOYSA-N; InChI=1/C36H72O2/c1-2-3-4-5-6-7-8-9-10-11-12-13-14-15-16-17-18-19-20-21-22-23-24-25-26-27-28-29-30-31-32-33-34-35-36(37)38/h2-35H2,1H3,(H,37,38) Key: LRKATBAZQAWAGV-UHFFFAOYAB
- SMILES: O=C(O)CCCCCCCCCCCCCCCCCCCCCCCCCCCCCCCCCCC

Properties
Chemical formula	C_{36}H_{72}O_{2}
Molar mass	537.0 g/mol
- Except where otherwise noted, data are given for materials in their standard state (at 25 °C [77 °F], 100 kPa). verify (what is ?) Infobox references

Hexatriacontylic acid, or hexatriacontanoic acid is a 36-carbon-long carboxylic acid and saturated fatty acid.

== See also ==
- List of saturated fatty acids
- Very long chain fatty acid
- List of carboxylic acids
