= List of saturated fatty acids =

Make up Saturated Fats

A lipid which has no double bonds in its hydrocarbon chain.

Saturated fatty acids are fatty acids that make up saturated fats.

Since the number of saturated fatty acids that we know of is extremely large, this list shown is by no means fully comprehensive. This list covers the few most common.

== Straight-chain ==
Saturated straight-chain fatty acids:

Common name	Systematic Name	Structural Formula	Lipid Numbers
Formic acid	Formic acid	HCOOH	C1:0
Acetic acid	Acetic acid	CH_{3}COOH	C2:0
Propionic acid	Propanoic acid	CH_{3}CH_{2}COOH	C3:0
Butyric acid	Butanoic acid	CH_{3}(CH_{2})_{2}COOH	C4:0
Valeric acid	Pentanoic acid	CH_{3}(CH_{2})_{3}COOH	C5:0
Caproic acid	Hexanoic acid	CH_{3}(CH_{2})_{4}COOH	C6:0
Enanthic acid	Heptanoic acid	CH_{3}(CH_{2})_{5}COOH	C7:0
Caprylic acid	Octanoic acid	CH_{3}(CH_{2})_{6}COOH	C8:0
Pelargonic acid	Nonanoic acid	CH_{3}(CH_{2})_{7}COOH	C9:0
Capric acid	Decanoic acid	CH_{3}(CH_{2})_{8}COOH	C10:0
Undecylic acid	Undecanoic acid	CH_{3}(CH_{2})_{9}COOH	C11:0
Lauric acid	Dodecanoic acid	CH_{3}(CH_{2})_{10}COOH	C12:0
Tridecylic acid	Tridecanoic acid	CH_{3}(CH_{2})_{11}COOH	C13:0
Myristic acid	Tetradecanoic acid	CH_{3}(CH_{2})_{12}COOH	C14:0
Pentadecylic acid	Pentadecanoic acid	CH_{3}(CH_{2})_{13}COOH	C15:0
Palmitic acid	Hexadecanoic acid	CH_{3}(CH_{2})_{14}COOH	C16:0
Margaric acid	Heptadecanoic acid	CH_{3}(CH_{2})_{15}COOH	C17:0
Stearic acid	Octadecanoic acid	CH_{3}(CH_{2})_{16}COOH	C18:0
Nonadecylic acid	Nonadecanoic acid	CH_{3}(CH_{2})_{17}COOH	C19:0
Arachidic acid	Icosanoic acid	CH_{3}(CH_{2})_{18}COOH	C20:0
Heneicosylic acid	Heneicosanoic acid	CH_{3}(CH_{2})_{19}COOH	C21:0
Behenic acid	Docosanoic acid	CH_{3}(CH_{2})_{20}COOH	C22:0
Tricosylic acid	Tricosanoic acid	CH_{3}(CH_{2})_{21}COOH	C23:0
Lignoceric acid	Tetracosanoic acid	CH_{3}(CH_{2})_{22}COOH	C24:0
Pentacosylic acid	Pentacosanoic acid	CH_{3}(CH_{2})_{23}COOH	C25:0
Cerotic acid	Hexacosanoic acid	CH_{3}(CH_{2})_{24}COOH	C26:0
Carboceric acid	Heptacosanoic acid	CH_{3}(CH_{2})_{25}COOH	C27:0
Montanic acid	Octacosanoic acid	CH_{3}(CH_{2})_{26}COOH	C28:0
Nonacosylic acid	Nonacosanoic acid	CH_{3}(CH_{2})_{27}COOH	C29:0
Melissic acid	Triacontanoic acid	CH_{3}(CH_{2})_{28}COOH	C30:0
Hentriacontylic acid	Hentriacontanoic acid	CH_{3}(CH_{2})_{29}COOH	C31:0
Lacceroic acid	Dotriacontanoic acid	CH_{3}(CH_{2})_{30}COOH	C32:0
Psyllic acid	Tritriacontanoic acid	CH_{3}(CH_{2})_{31}COOH	C33:0
Geddic acid	Tetratriacontanoic acid	CH_{3}(CH_{2})_{32}COOH	C34:0
Ceroplastic acid	Pentatriacontanoic acid	CH_{3}(CH_{2})_{33}COOH	C35:0
Hexatriacontylic acid	Hexatriacontanoic acid	CH_{3}(CH_{2})_{34}COOH	C36:0
Heptatriacontylic acid	Heptatriacontanoic acid	CH_{3}(CH_{2})_{35}COOH	C37:0
Octatriacontylic acid	Octatriacontanoic acid	CH_{3}(CH_{2})_{36}COOH	C38:0
Nonatriacontylic acid	Nonatriacontanoic acid	CH_{3}(CH_{2})_{37}COOH	C39:0
Tetracontylic acid	Tetracontanoic acid	CH_{3}(CH_{2})_{38}COOH	C40:0

== Branched-chain ==
Saturated branched-chain fatty acids:

Common name	Systematic Name	Structural Formula	Lipid Numbers
Isobutyric acid	2-Methylpropanoic acid	(CH_{3})_{2}CHCOOH	iso C4:0
Isovaleric acid	3-Methylbutanoic acid	(CH_{3})_{2}CHCH_{2}COOH	iso C5:0
2-Methylbutyric acid	2-Methylbutanoic acid	CH_{3}CH_{2}CH(CH_{3})COOH	anteiso C5:0
Pivalic acid	2,2-Dimethylpropanoic acid	(CH_{3})_{3}CCOOH	C5:0
Isocaproic acid	4-Methylpentanoic acid	(CH_{3})_{2}CH(CH_{2})_{2}COOH	iso C6:0
Octoic acid	2-Ethylhexanoic acid	CH_{3}(CH_{2})_{3}CH(CH_{2}CH_{3})COOH	C8:0
13-Methylmyristic acid	13-Methyltetradecanoic acid	(CH_{3})_{2}CH(CH_{2})_{11}COOH	iso C15:0
Tuberculostearic acid	10-Methyloctadecanoic acid	CH_{3}(CH_{2})_{7}CH(CH_{3})(CH_{2})_{8}COOH	C19:0
Pristanic acid	2,6,10,14-Tetramethylpentadecanoic acid	(CH_{3})_{2}CH(CH_{2})_{3}CH(CH_{3})(CH_{2})_{3}CH(CH_{3})(CH_{2})_{3}CH(CH_{3})COOH	C19:0
Phytanic acid	(7R,11R)-3,7,11,15-Tetramethylhexadecanoic acid	(CH_{3})_{2}CH(CH_{2})_{3}CH(CH_{3})(CH_{2})_{3}CH(CH_{3})(CH_{2})_{3}CH(CH_{3})CH_{2}COOH	C20:0

== See also ==
- List of unsaturated fatty acids
- Carboxylic acid
  - List of carboxylic acids
- Dicarboxylic acid
