= Carboceric acid =

27-Carbon fatty acid

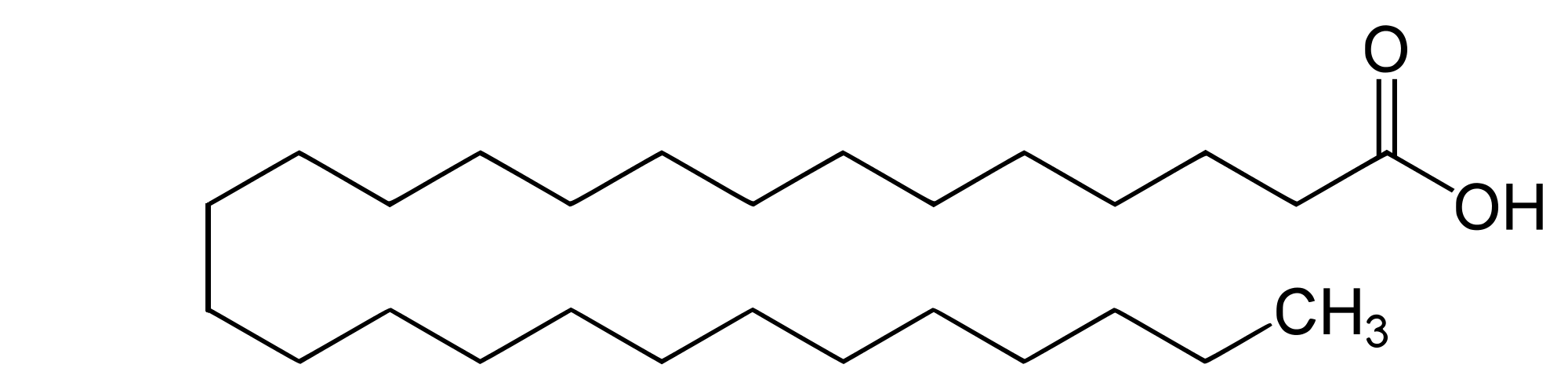

Names
- Preferred IUPAC name Heptacosanoic acid
- Other names Heptacosylic acid C27:0 (Lipid numbers)

Identifiers
CAS Number	7138-40-1
3D model (JSmol)	Interactive image
ChemSpider	21994
ECHA InfoCard	100.027.670
PubChem CID	23524
UNII	9J1CDT7DOJ
CompTox Dashboard (EPA)	DTXSID5075070
- InChI: InChI=1S/C27H54O2/c1-2-3-4-5-6-7-8-9-10-11-12-13-14-15-16-17-18-19-20-21-22-23-24-25-26-27(28)29/h2-26H2,1H3,(H,28,29) Key: VXZBFBRLRNDJCS-UHFFFAOYSA-N
- SMILES: O=C(O)CCCCCCCCCCCCCCCCCCCCCCCCCC

Properties
Chemical formula	C_{27}H_{54}O_{2}
Molar mass	410.41 g/mol
- Except where otherwise noted, data are given for materials in their standard state (at 25 °C [77 °F], 100 kPa). Infobox references

Carboceric acid, or heptacosanoic acid or heptacosylic acid, is a 27-carbon long-chain saturated fatty acid with the chemical formula CH_{3}(CH_{2})_{25}COOH. Its name derives from a combination of the word "Carbon" and κηρός (Keros), meaning beeswax or honeycomb in Ancient Greek, since the acid can be found in the mineral ozokerite, also known as ozocerite.

== See also ==
- List of saturated fatty acids
- Very long chain fatty acids
- List of carboxylic acids
