= Geddic acid =

34-Carbon fatty acid

Names
- Preferred IUPAC name Tetratriacontanoic acid
- Other names: Gheddic acid; Ghedoic acid; C34:0 (Lipid numbers)

Identifiers
CAS Number	38232-04-1
3D model (JSmol)	Interactive image
ChEBI	CHEBI:76216
ChemSpider	85266
PubChem CID	94485
UNII	HLT2OTQ105
CompTox Dashboard (EPA)	DTXSID00191624
- InChI: InChI=1S/C34H68O2/c1-2-3-4-5-6-7-8-9-10-11-12-13-14-15-16-17-18-19-20-21-22-23-24-25-26-27-28-29-30-31-32-33-34(35)36/h2-33H2,1H3,(H,35,36) Key: UTGPYHWDXYRYGT-UHFFFAOYSA-N; InChI=1/C34H68O2/c1-2-3-4-5-6-7-8-9-10-11-12-13-14-15-16-17-18-19-20-21-22-23-24-25-26-27-28-29-30-31-32-33-34(35)36/h2-33H2,1H3,(H,35,36) Key: UTGPYHWDXYRYGT-UHFFFAOYAK
- SMILES: O=C(O)CCCCCCCCCCCCCCCCCCCCCCCCCCCCCCCCC

Properties
Chemical formula	C_{34}H_{68}O_{2}
Molar mass	508.916 g·mol^{−1}
Density	0.87 g/cm^{3}
- Except where otherwise noted, data are given for materials in their standard state (at 25 °C [77 °F], 100 kPa). verify (what is ?) Infobox references

Geddic acid, or tetratriacontanoic acid, is a 34-carbon-long carboxylic acid and saturated fatty acid. It occurs in cotton, carnauba, candelilla wax, and in ghedda wax (wild beeswax), from which its common name is derived.

== See also ==
- List of carboxylic acids
- List of saturated fatty acids
- Very long chain fatty acid
