= Nonacosylic acid =

29-Carbon fatty acid

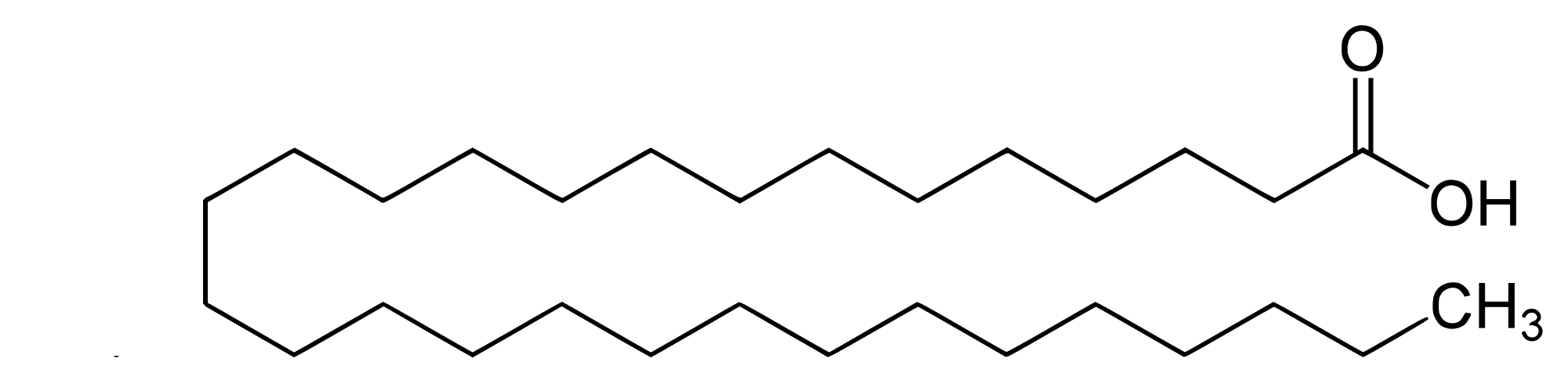

Names
- Preferred IUPAC name Nonacosanoic acid
- Other names Nonacosylic acid

Identifiers
CAS Number	4250-38-8
3D model (JSmol)	Interactive image
ChEBI	CHEBI:84867
ChemSpider	19071
ECHA InfoCard	100.022.010
EC Number	224-210-9
PubChem CID	20245
UNII	PD7M4BT88J
CompTox Dashboard (EPA)	DTXSID60195284
- InChI: InChI=1S/C29H58O2/c1-2-3-4-5-6-7-8-9-10-11-12-13-14-15-16-17-18-19-20-21-22-23-24-25-26-27-28-29(30)31/h2-28H2,1H3,(H,30,31) Key: IHEJEKZAKSNRLY-UHFFFAOYSA-N
- SMILES: O=C(O)CCCCCCCCCCCCCCCCCCCCCCCCCCCC

Properties
Chemical formula	C_{29}H_{58}O_{2}
Molar mass	438.44 g/mol
- Except where otherwise noted, data are given for materials in their standard state (at 25 °C [77 °F], 100 kPa). Infobox references

Nonacosylic acid, or nonacosanoic acid, is a 29-carbon long-chain saturated fatty acid with the chemical formula CH_{3}(CH_{2})_{27}COOH.

== See also ==
- List of saturated fatty acids
- List of carboxylic acids
