= Heptatriacontanoic acid =

37-Carbon fatty acid

Names
- Preferred IUPAC name Heptatriacontanoic acid

Identifiers
CAS Number	38232-07-4
3D model (JSmol)	Interactive image
ChEMBL	ChEMBL3103071
ChemSpider	4445724
PubChem CID	5282597
CompTox Dashboard (EPA)	DTXSID10415222
- InChI: InChI=1S/C37H74O2/c1-2-3-4-5-6-7-8-9-10-11-12-13-14-15-16-17-18-19-20-21-22-23-24-25-26-27-28-29-30-31-32-33-34-35-36-37(38)39/h2-36H2,1H3,(H,38,39) Key: DEQQJCLFURALOA-UHFFFAOYSA-N; InChI=1/C37H74O2/c1-2-3-4-5-6-7-8-9-10-11-12-13-14-15-16-17-18-19-20-21-22-23-24-25-26-27-28-29-30-31-32-33-34-35-36-37(38)39/h2-36H2,1H3,(H,38,39) Key: DEQQJCLFURALOA-UHFFFAOYAP
- SMILES: O=C(O)CCCCCCCCCCCCCCCCCCCCCCCCCCCCCCCCCCCC

Properties
Chemical formula	C_{37}H_{74}O_{2}
Molar mass	550.997 g·mol^{−1}
- Except where otherwise noted, data are given for materials in their standard state (at 25 °C [77 °F], 100 kPa). Infobox references

Heptatriacontanoic acid, or heptatriacontylic acid, is a 37-carbon saturated fatty acid.

== Sources ==
Heptatriacontanoic acid is present in Abelmoschus manihot and Alpinia nigra. Heptatriacontanoic acid was also measured in zooplankton.

== Compounds ==
The compound 4,21-dimethyl-5,19-di-(trans)-enoyl-heptatriacontanoic acid is the "structure of the major homolog of free mycobacteric acids" of Mycobacterium brumae.

== Preparation ==
The expired U.S. patent 5502226 covers a method of ω-hydroxy acid preparation that includes heptatriacontanoic acid.

== See also ==
- List of saturated fatty acids
- List of carboxylic acids
