= Tetracontanoic acid =

40-Carbon fatty acid

Names
- Preferred IUPAC name Tetracontanoic acid
- Other names Tetracontylic acid

Identifiers
CAS Number	80440-54-6
3D model (JSmol)	Interactive image
ChemSpider	15329598
PubChem CID	14324899
UNII	78AXU5H1OR
CompTox Dashboard (EPA)	DTXSID20230322
- InChI: InChI=1S/C40H80O2/c1-2-3-4-5-6-7-8-9-10-11-12-13-14-15-16-17-18-19-20-21-22-23-24-25-26-27-28-29-30-31-32-33-34-35-36-37-38-39-40(41)42/h2-39H2,1H3,(H,41,42) Key: CWXZMNMLGZGDSW-UHFFFAOYSA-N
- SMILES: CCCCCCCCCCCCCCCCCCCCCCCCCCCCCCCCCCCCCCCC(=O)O

Properties
Chemical formula	C_{40}H_{80}O_{2}
Molar mass	593.078 g·mol^{−1}
Density	0.8685 g/cm^{3}
- Except where otherwise noted, data are given for materials in their standard state (at 25 °C [77 °F], 100 kPa). Infobox references

Tetracontanoic acid is a 40-carbon saturated fatty acid with the chemical formula CH_{3}(CH_{2})_{38}COOH. This is a long-chain saturated fatty acid. It is also a carboxylic acid with a 40-carbon backbone, making it one of the higher molecular weight fatty acids. This compound is typically found in various natural waxes and is known for its high melting point and stability.

== Synthesis ==
=== Synthetic methods ===
Tetracontanoic acid is produced via two primary approaches: hydrogenation of unsaturated fatty acids or elongation of shorter-chain fatty acids. A key method involves catalytic hydrogenation of oleic acid (a monounsaturated fatty acid) using palladium or nickel catalysts under elevated pressure and temperature.

=== Industrial manufacturing ===
Commercial production typically involves isolating the compound from natural sources like beeswax or carnauba wax. The process begins with saponification of the wax, then it is acidified to isolate free fatty acids. These acids are then refined through distillation or crystallization processes.

== Uses ==
The acid is used to produce various emulsifiers, lubricants, surfactants, and waxes.

== See also ==
- List of saturated fatty acids
- List of carboxylic acids
