= Pentadecanoylcarnitine =

Identifiers
3D model (JSmol)	Interactive image
ChEBI	CHEBI:131886
PubChem CID	123132011
- InChI: InChI=1S/C22H43NO4/c1-5-6-7-8-9-10-11-12-13-14-15-16-17-22(26)27-20(18-21(24)25)19-23(2,3)4/h20H,5-19H2,1-4H3 Key: MDDWQHVKSHTZTD-UHFFFAOYSA-N
- SMILES: CCCCCCCCCCCCCCC(=O)OC(CC(=O)[O-])C[N+](C)(C)C

Properties
Chemical formula	C_{22}H_{43}NO_{4}
Molar mass	385.589 g·mol^{−1}
- Except where otherwise noted, data are given for materials in their standard state (at 25 °C [77 °F], 100 kPa). Infobox references

Pentadecanoylcarnitine is an endocannabinoid and a metabolite of C15:0. It is an agonist at both CB1 and CB2 receptors. Also, it is an agonist at serotonin receptors (5HT1A and 5HT1B).
