= C25H50O2 =

The molecular formula C_{25}H_{50}O_{2} (molar mass: 382.663 g/mol, exact mass: 382.3811 u) may refer to:

- Pentacosylic acid, or hyenic acid
- Stearyl heptanoate
