= Tricosylic acid =

23-Carbon fatty acid

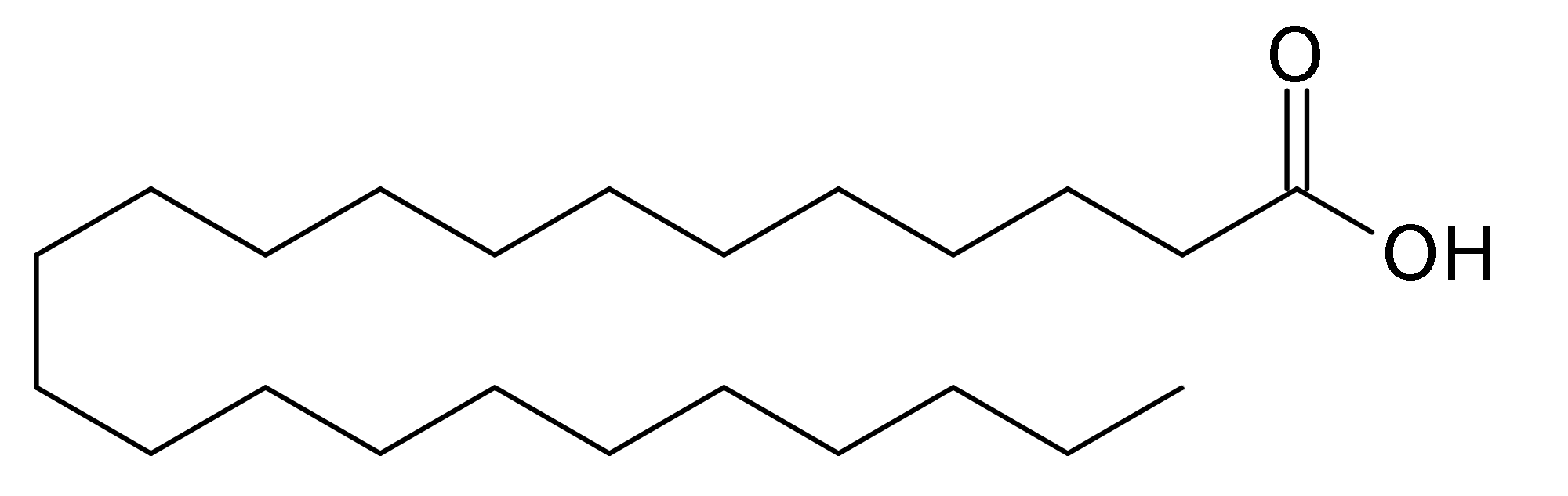

Names
- Preferred IUPAC name Tricosanoic acid
- Other names Tricosylic acid

Identifiers
CAS Number	2433-96-7
3D model (JSmol)	Interactive image
ChemSpider	16170
ECHA InfoCard	100.017.654
PubChem CID	17085
UNII	MUC9A0MS6V
CompTox Dashboard (EPA)	DTXSID40179067
- InChI: InChI=1S/C23H46O2/c1-2-3-4-5-6-7-8-9-10-11-12-13-14-15-16-17-18-19-20-21-22-23(24)25/h2-22H2,1H3,(H,24,25) Key: XEZVDURJDFGERA-UHFFFAOYSA-N
- SMILES: CCCCCCCCCCCCCCCCCCCCCCC(=O)O

Properties
Chemical formula	C_{23}H_{46}O_{2}
Molar mass	354.35 g/mol
- Except where otherwise noted, data are given for materials in their standard state (at 25 °C [77 °F], 100 kPa). Infobox references

Tricosylic acid, or tricosanoic acid, is a 23-carbon long-chain saturated fatty acid with the chemical formula CH_{3}(CH_{2})_{21}COOH.

== Natural occurrence ==
Tricosylic acid occurs naturally in the leaves of Cecropia adenopus and in fennel. It also occurs in small quantities in the lipids of various other plants.

== See also ==
- List of saturated fatty acids
- Very long chain fatty acids
- List of carboxylic acids
