= Nonatriacontanoic acid =

Names
- Preferred IUPAC name Nonatriacontanoic acid
- Other names Nonatriacontylic acid

Identifiers
CAS Number	121730-32-3
3D model (JSmol)	Interactive image
ChemSpider	28678997
PubChem CID	14324898
CompTox Dashboard (EPA)	DTXSID90558949
- InChI: InChI=1S/C39H78O2/c1-2-3-4-5-6-7-8-9-10-11-12-13-14-15-16-17-18-19-20-21-22-23-24-25-26-27-28-29-30-31-32-33-34-35-36-37-38-39(40)41/h2-38H2,1H3,(H,40,41) Key: SDUXWTQRQALDFW-UHFFFAOYSA-N
- SMILES: CCCCCCCCCCCCCCCCCCCCCCCCCCCCCCCCCCCCCCC(=O)O

Properties
Chemical formula	C_{39}H_{78}O_{2}
Molar mass	579.051 g·mol^{−1}

Hazards
- GHS labelling
Hazard statements	H302, H315, H319, H335
Precautionary statements	P280, P305+P351+P338
- Except where otherwise noted, data are given for materials in their standard state (at 25 °C [77 °F], 100 kPa). Infobox references

Nonatriacontanoic acid is a 39-carbon saturated fatty acid with the chemical formula CH_{3}(CH_{2})_{37}COOH. The acid is rare due to its longer carbon chain, imparting its distinct physical and chemical properties.

== Synthesis ==
=== Synthetic methods ===
Nonatriacontanoic acid is typically produced by oxidizing long-chain alcohols or aldehydes. A standard approach utilizes nonatriacontanol as the starting material, employing strong oxidizers like potassium permanganate(KMnO_{4}) or chromium trioxide (CrO_{3}) in an acidic environment to drive the reaction.

=== Industrial manufacturing ===
Commercially, the acid is often obtained by extracting and refining it from natural waxes, such as those derived from bees or plants. Key steps of the process include saponifying the waxes to break down esters, then followed by acidification to isolate the free fatty acid.

== Uses ==
The compound is used to produce various cosmetics, lubricants, and as a component in wax formulations.

== See also ==
- List of saturated fatty acids
- List of carboxylic acids
