= Octatriacontanoic acid =

38-Carbon fatty acid

Names
- Preferred IUPAC name Octatriacontanoic acid

Identifiers
CAS Number	68947-62-6
3D model (JSmol)	Interactive image
ChEBI	CHEBI:165445
ChEMBL	ChEMBL165445
ChemSpider	4445725
PubChem CID	5282598
UNII	8TO92941ES
CompTox Dashboard (EPA)	DTXSID50219009
- InChI: InChI=1S/C38H76O2/c1-2-3-4-5-6-7-8-9-10-11-12-13-14-15-16-17-18-19-20-21-22-23-24-25-26-27-28-29-30-31-32-33-34-35-36-37-38(39)40/h2-37H2,1H3,(H,39,40) Key: AJQRZOBUACOSBG-UHFFFAOYSA-N
- SMILES: CCCCCCCCCCCCCCCCCCCCCCCCCCCCCCCCCCCCCC(=O)O

Properties
Chemical formula	C_{38}H_{76}O_{2}
Molar mass	565.024 g·mol^{−1}
- Except where otherwise noted, data are given for materials in their standard state (at 25 °C [77 °F], 100 kPa). Infobox references

Octatriacontanoic acid, or octatriacontylic acid, is a 38-carbon saturated fatty acid with the chemical formula CH_{3}(CH_{2})_{36}COOH. The acid is rare due to its longer carbon backbone, imparting its special physical and chemical properties.

== Synthesis ==
=== Synthetic methods ===
Octatriacontanoic acid can be synthesized via multiple established carboxylic acid preparation techniques. Key approaches include oxidation reactions, where primary alcohols or aldehydes are treated with oxidizing agents such as potassium permanganate (KMnO_{4}) or chromium trioxide (CrO_{3}) to produce the acid.

=== Industrial production ===
Commercial synthesis typically employs Grignard reagent carboxylation. This process involves reacting a Grignard reagent with carbon dioxide (CO_{2}) to form a metal carboxylate intermediate, which is subsequently acidified to yield the final carboxylic acid. This method is preferred industrially due to its high efficiency and scalability, enabling cost-effective large-scale production.

== Uses ==
Due to its emollient properties, the compound is used to produce cosmetics and personal care products as a valuable ingredient in lotions and creams. Industrial uses include producing lubricants and surfactants.

== See also ==
- List of saturated fatty acids
- List of carboxylic acids
