= Ammonium heptadecanoate =

Names
- IUPAC name azanium;heptadecanoate

Identifiers
CAS Number	94266-36-1
3D model (JSmol)	Interactive image
EC Number	304-443-3
PubChem CID	3024185
CompTox Dashboard (EPA)	DTXSID20241332
- InChI: InChI=1S/C17H34O2.H3N/c1-2-3-4-5-6-7-8-9-10-11-12-13-14-15-16-17(18)19;/h2-16H2,1H3,(H,18,19);1H3 Key: RAMIXRMJVONRPT-UHFFFAOYSA-N
- SMILES: CCCCCCCCCCCCCCCCC(=O)O.N

Properties
Chemical formula	C_{17}H_{37}NO_{2}
Molar mass	287.488 g·mol^{−1}
Appearance	waxy solid
Boiling point	298.5 °C
Solubility in water	soluble

Hazards
Flash point	158.4 °C
- Except where otherwise noted, data are given for materials in their standard state (at 25 °C [77 °F], 100 kPa). Infobox references

Ammonium heptadecanoate is a chemical compound with the chemical formula C_{17}H_{33}O_{2}NH_{4}. This is an organic ammonium salt of heptadecanoic acid (margaric acid).

== Synthesis ==
Ammonium heptadecanoate is synthesized through the reaction of margaric acid with ammonia. This reaction involves dissolving the acid in a solvent and then adding an ammonia solution to prepare the salt. The resulting compound can be obtained through recrystallization.

== Physical properties ==
Ammonium heptadecanoate typically appears as a waxy solid and is soluble in water.
