= Hentriacontylic acid =

31-Carbon fatty acid

Names
- Preferred IUPAC name Hentriacontanoic acid
- Other names Henatriacontylic acid; Henatriacontanoic acid

Identifiers
| CAS Number | 38232-01-8 |
| 3D model (JSmol) | Interactive image |
| ChemSpider | 34819 |
| PubChem CID | 37982 |
| UNII | B8P9L2CU4E |
| CompTox Dashboard (EPA) | DTXSID40191623 |
- InChI: InChI=1S/C31H62O2/c1-2-3-4-5-6-7-8-9-10-11-12-13-14-15-16-17-18-19-20-21-22-23-24-25-26-27-28-29-30-31(32)33/h2-30H2,1H3,(H,32,33) Key: ONLMUMPTRGEPCH-UHFFFAOYSA-N; InChI=1/C31H62O2/c1-2-3-4-5-6-7-8-9-10-11-12-13-14-15-16-17-18-19-20-21-22-23-24-25-26-27-28-29-30-31(32)33/h2-30H2,1H3,(H,32,33) Key: ONLMUMPTRGEPCH-UHFFFAOYAE
- SMILES: OC(CCCCCCCCCCCCCCCCCCCCCCCCCCCCCC)=O

Properties
| Chemical formula | C_{31}H_{62}O_{2} |
| Molar mass | 466.835 g·mol^{−1} |
| Melting point | 109.3 to 109.6 °C (228.7 to 229.3 °F; 382.4 to 382.8 K) |
- Except where otherwise noted, data are given for materials in their standard state (at 25 °C [77 °F], 100 kPa). verify (what is ?) Infobox references

Hentriacontylic acid (also hentriacontanoic acid, henatriacontylic acid, or henatriacontanoic acid) is a carboxylic saturated fatty acid.

== Sources ==
Hentriacontylic acid can be derived from peat wax and montan wax.

The olefin triacontene-1 can be reacted to yield linear n-henatriacontanoic acid.

== See also ==
- List of saturated fatty acids
