= Heneicosylic acid =

21-Carbon fatty acid

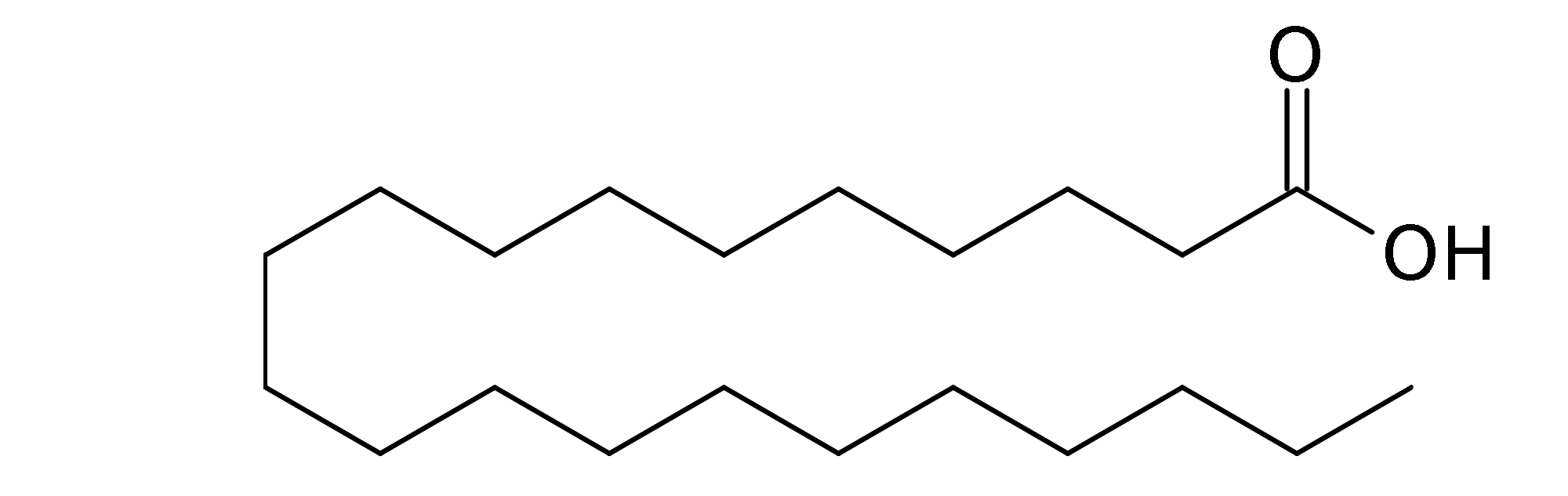

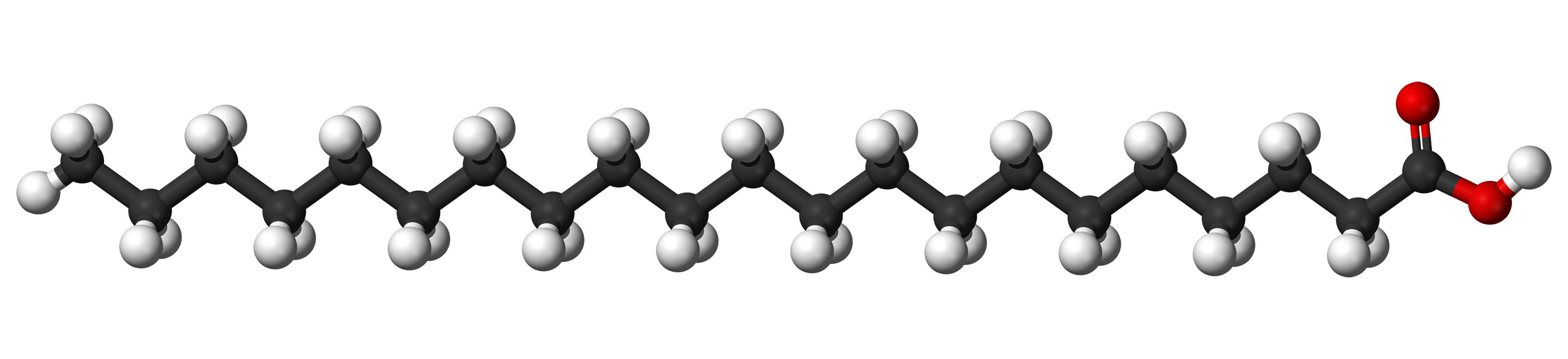

Names
- Preferred IUPAC name Henicosanoic acid
- Other names Heneicosylic acid

Identifiers
CAS Number	2363-71-5
3D model (JSmol)	Interactive image
ChemSpider	16012
ECHA InfoCard	100.017.377
PubChem CID	16898
UNII	NRY04FUK8H
CompTox Dashboard (EPA)	DTXSID0021595
- InChI: InChI=1S/C21H42O2/c1-2-3-4-5-6-7-8-9-10-11-12-13-14-15-16-17-18-19-20-21(22)23/h2-20H2,1H3,(H,22,23) Key: CKDDRHZIAZRDBW-UHFFFAOYSA-N; InChI=1S/C21H42O2/c1-2-3-4-5-6-7-8-9-10-11-12-13-14-15-16-17-18-19-20-21 (22)23/h2-20H2,1H3,(H,22,23) Key: CKDDRHZIAZRDBW-UHFFFAOYSA-N
- SMILES: CCCCCCCCCCCCCCCCCCCCC(=O)O

Properties
Chemical formula	C_{21}H_{42}O_{2}
Molar mass	326.55 g/mol
- Except where otherwise noted, data are given for materials in their standard state (at 25 °C [77 °F], 100 kPa). Infobox references

Heneicosylic acid, or heneicosanoic acid, is the organic compound with the formula CH_{3}(CH_{2})_{19}CO_{2}H. It is the straight-chain 21-carbon saturated fatty acid. It is a colorless solid.

It has shown relevance in the production of foams, paints, and related viscous materials. A laboratory preparation involves permanganate oxidation of 1-docosene (CH_{3}(CH_{2})_{19}CH=CH_{2}).

== See also ==
- List of saturated fatty acids
- Very long chain fatty acids
- List of carboxylic acids
