= C32H64O2 =

The molecular formula C_{32}H_{64}O_{2} (molar mass: 480.85 g/mol, exact mass: 480.4906 u) may refer to:

- Cetyl palmitate, or Hexadecyl hexadecanoate
- Lacceroic acid
