= Ceroplastic acid =

35-Carbon fatty acid

Names
- Preferred IUPAC name Pentatriacontanoic acid

Identifiers
CAS Number	38232-05-2
3D model (JSmol)	Interactive image
ChemSpider	4445722
PubChem CID	5282595
UNII	M78J737BEQ
CompTox Dashboard (EPA)	DTXSID50415221
- InChI: InChI=1S/C35H70O2/c1-2-3-4-5-6-7-8-9-10-11-12-13-14-15-16-17-18-19-20-21-22-23-24-25-26-27-28-29-30-31-32-33-34-35(36)37/h2-34H2,1H3,(H,36,37) Key: HVUCKZJUWZBJDP-UHFFFAOYSA-N; InChI=1/C35H70O2/c1-2-3-4-5-6-7-8-9-10-11-12-13-14-15-16-17-18-19-20-21-22-23-24-25-26-27-28-29-30-31-32-33-34-35(36)37/h2-34H2,1H3,(H,36,37) Key: HVUCKZJUWZBJDP-UHFFFAOYAQ
- SMILES: CCCCCCCCCCCCCCCCCCCCCCCCCCCCCCCCCCC(=O)O

Properties
Chemical formula	C_{35}H_{70}O_{2}
Molar mass	522.93 g/mol
Melting point	96–98 °C (205–208 °F; 369–371 K)
- Except where otherwise noted, data are given for materials in their standard state (at 25 °C [77 °F], 100 kPa). verify (what is ?) Infobox references

Ceroplastic acid (or pentatriacontanoic acid) is a 35-carbon-long saturated aliphatic carboxylic acid.

The name is derived from the Latin word cerotus, which in turn was derived from the Ancient Greek word κηρός (keros), meaning beeswax or honeycomb, combined with "plastic" from the Latin plasticus (meaning of molding, from Greek plastikos, from plassein to mold, form).

== Applications ==
Like many other carboxylic acids, ceroplastic acid can react with UV curable moiety alcohols to form reactive esters, such as 2-allyloxyethanol.

== See also ==
- List of saturated fatty acids
