= Melissic acid =

30-Carbon fatty acid

Names
- Preferred IUPAC name Triacontanoic acid

Identifiers
CAS Number	506-50-3
3D model (JSmol)	Interactive image
ChemSpider	10039
ECHA InfoCard	100.007.312
PubChem CID	10471
UNII	HLT2OTQ105
CompTox Dashboard (EPA)	DTXSID7075052
- InChI: InChI=1S/C30H60O2/c1-2-3-4-5-6-7-8-9-10-11-12-13-14-15-16-17-18-19-20-21-22-23-24-25-26-27-28-29-30(31)32/h2-29H2,1H3,(H,31,32) Key: VHOCUJPBKOZGJD-UHFFFAOYSA-N; InChI=1/C30H60O2/c1-2-3-4-5-6-7-8-9-10-11-12-13-14-15-16-17-18-19-20-21-22-23-24-25-26-27-28-29-30(31)32/h2-29H2,1H3,(H,31,32) Key: VHOCUJPBKOZGJD-UHFFFAOYAR
- SMILES: CCCCCCCCCCCCCCCCCCCCCCCCCCCCCC(=O)O

Properties
Chemical formula	C_{30}H_{60}O_{2}
Molar mass	452.46 g/mol
- Except where otherwise noted, data are given for materials in their standard state (at 25 °C [77 °F], 100 kPa). verify (what is ?) Infobox references

Melissic acid (or triacontanoic acid) is the organic compound with the formula CH_{3}(CH_{2})_{28}CO_{2}H. It is classified as a very long chain fatty acid, a subset of saturated fatty acids. It is a white solid that is soluble in organic solvents. Melissic acid gets its name from the Greek word melissa meaning bee, since it was found in beeswax.

== Synthesis ==
n-Triacontanoic acid was synthesized by Bleyberg and Ulrich (1931) and by G.M. Robinson.

== Self-assembly ==
Triacontanoic acid and triacontanamide (CH_{3}(CH_{2})_{28}-CONH_{2}) can be self-assembled.

== See also ==
- List of saturated fatty acids
