= 1-Tetracosanol =

Names
- Preferred IUPAC name Tetracosan-1-ol
- Other names Lignoceryl alcohol

Identifiers
CAS Number	506-51-4
3D model (JSmol)	Interactive image
ChEBI	CHEBI:77413
ChemSpider	10040
ECHA InfoCard	100.007.313
PubChem CID	10472
UNII	2N0PI37IOC
CompTox Dashboard (EPA)	DTXSID8027161
- InChI: InChI=1S/C24H50O/c1-2-3-4-5-6-7-8-9-10-11-12-13-14-15-16-17-18-19-20-21-22-23-24-25/h25H,2-24H2,1H3 Key: TYWMIZZBOVGFOV-UHFFFAOYSA-N
- SMILES: OCCCCCCCCCCCCCCCCCCCCCCCC

Properties
Chemical formula	C_{24}H_{50}O
Molar mass	354.663 g·mol^{−1}
Melting point	75 °C (167 °F; 348 K)
Solubility in water	0.001 g/L (23 °C)

Hazards
Flash point	218 °C (424 °F; 491 K)
- Except where otherwise noted, data are given for materials in their standard state (at 25 °C [77 °F], 100 kPa). verify (what is ?) Infobox references

1-Tetracosanol (lignoceryl alcohol) is a fatty alcohol containing 24 carbon atoms, usually derived from the fatty acid lignoceric acid.
