= Barbier–Wieland degradation =

Chemical reaction

The Barbier–Wieland degradation is a procedure for shortening the carbon chain of a carboxylic acid by one carbon. It only works when the carbon adjacent to the carboxyl is a simple methylene bridge (an aliphatic carbon with no substituents). The reaction sequence involves conversion of the carboxyl and alpha carbon into an alkene, which is then cleaved by oxidation to convert the former alpha position into a carboxyl itself.

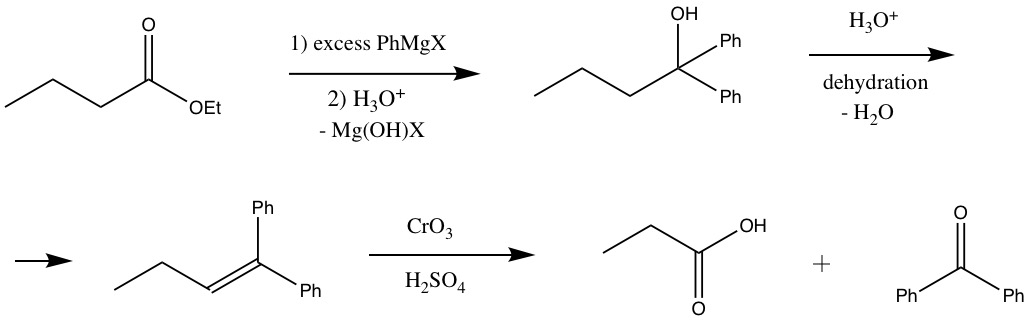
Barbier-Wieland method: going from butanoic acid to propanoic acid
