= Psyllic acid =

33-Carbon fatty acid

Names
- Preferred IUPAC name Tritriacontanoic acid

Identifiers
CAS Number	38232-03-0
3D model (JSmol)	Interactive image
ChemSpider	157945
PubChem CID	181572
UNII	5LSY5B2356
CompTox Dashboard (EPA)	DTXSID90959174
- InChI: InChI=1S/C33H66O2/c1-2-3-4-5-6-7-8-9-10-11-12-13-14-15-16-17-18-19-20-21-22-23-24-25-26-27-28-29-30-31-32-33(34)35/h2-32H2,1H3,(H,34,35) Key: HQRWEDFDJHDPJC-UHFFFAOYSA-N; InChI=1/C33H66O2/c1-2-3-4-5-6-7-8-9-10-11-12-13-14-15-16-17-18-19-20-21-22-23-24-25-26-27-28-29-30-31-32-33(34)35/h2-32H2,1H3,(H,34,35) Key: HQRWEDFDJHDPJC-UHFFFAOYAH
- SMILES: O=C(O)CCCCCCCCCCCCCCCCCCCCCCCCCCCCCCCC

Properties
Chemical formula	C_{33}H_{66}O_{2}
Molar mass	494.889 g·mol^{−1}
- Except where otherwise noted, data are given for materials in their standard state (at 25 °C [77 °F], 100 kPa). verify (what is ?) Infobox references

Psyllic acid (also psyllostearic acid, tritriacontanoic acid or ceromelissic acid) is a saturated fatty acid. The rare fatty acid occurs in insect waxes, in the wax of wax scale insects, in the propolis of bees and bumblebees and in a few plants. Its name is derived from the alder leaf flea (Psylla alni).

== Alkali salts ==
The alkali salts of psyllic acid are precipitated when alcoholic solutions of the acid and an alkali hydroxide are mixed. The silver and barium salts can be obtained by adding aqueous alcoholic solutions of silver nitrate and barium chloride to alcoholic solutions of the acid. The following salts have been analyzed: C_{33}H_{65}O_{2}Na, C_{66}H_{130}O_{4}Ba, and C_{33}H_{65}O_{2}Ag. Psylla wax is hydrolyzed by alcoholic potassium hydroxide as well as by hydrobromic acid.

== Nutritional sources ==
Psyllic acid is present in Chinese wolfberries.

== See also ==
- List of saturated fatty acids
