= Caprylic acid =

8-Carbon fatty acid

- Skeletal formula

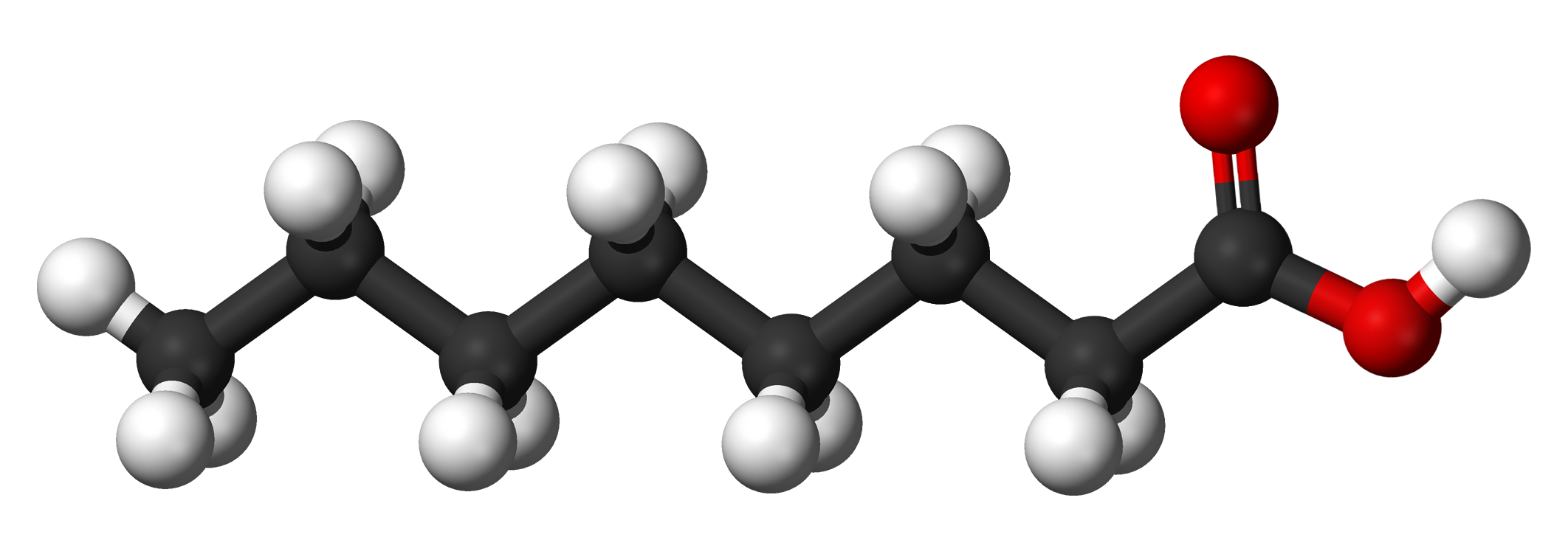
- Ball-and-stick model

Names
- Preferred IUPAC name Octanoic acid
- Other names 1-Heptanecarboxylic acid Octylic acid Octoic acid C8:0 (lipid numbers)

Identifiers
CAS Number	124-07-2
3D model (JSmol)	Interactive image
ChEBI	CHEBI:28837
ChEMBL	ChEMBL324846
ChemSpider	370
DrugBank	DB04519
ECHA InfoCard	100.004.253
EC Number	204-677-5
IUPHAR/BPS	4585
KEGG	D05220
PubChem CID	379
UNII	OBL58JN025
CompTox Dashboard (EPA)	DTXSID3021645
- InChI: InChI=1S/C8H16O2/c1-2-3-4-5-6-7-8(9)10/h2-7H2,1H3,(H,9,10) Key: WWZKQHOCKIZLMA-UHFFFAOYSA-N; InChI=1/C8H16O2/c1-2-3-4-5-6-7-8(9)10/h2-7H2,1H3,(H,9,10) Key: WWZKQHOCKIZLMA-UHFFFAOYAH
- SMILES: CCCCCCCC(=O)O

Properties
Chemical formula	C_{8}H_{16}O_{2}
Molar mass	144.214 g/mol
Appearance	Oily colorless liquid
Odor	Faint, fruity-acid; irritating
Density	0.910 g/cm^{3}
Melting point	16.7 °C (62.1 °F; 289.8 K)
Boiling point	239.7 °C (463.5 °F; 512.8 K)
Solubility in water	0.068 g/100 mL
Solubility	Soluble in alcohol, chloroform, ether, CS_{2}, petroleum ether, acetonitrile
log P	3.05
Vapor pressure	0.25 Pa
Acidity (pK_{a})	4.89; 1.055 (2.06–2.63 K); 1.53 (−191 °C)
Magnetic susceptibility (χ)	−101.60·10^{−6} cm^{3}/mol
Refractive index (n_{D})	1.4285

Thermochemistry
Heat capacity (C)	297.9 J/K·mol
Std enthalpy of formation (Δ_{f}H^{⦵}_{298})	−636 kJ/mol

Hazards
- GHS labelling
Pictograms	(GHS05: Corrosive)
Signal word	Danger
Hazard statements	H314
Precautionary statements	P264, P280, P301+P330+P331, P303+P361+P353, P304+P340+P310, P305+P351+P338+P310, P363, P405, P501
NFPA 704 (fire diamond)	3 0 1 COR
Flash point	130 °C (266 °F; 403 K)
Autoignition temperature	440 °C (824 °F; 713 K)
- Lethal dose or concentration (LD, LC)
LD_{50} (median dose)	10.08 g/kg (orally in rats)

Related compounds
Related compounds	Heptanoic acid, nonanoic acid
- Except where otherwise noted, data are given for materials in their standard state (at 25 °C [77 °F], 100 kPa). verify (what is ?) Infobox references

Caprylic acid (from Latin capra 'goat'), also known under the systematic name octanoic acid or C8 acid, is a saturated fatty acid, medium-chain fatty acid (MCFA). It has the structural formula H_{3}C−(CH_{2})_{6}−COOH, and is a colorless oily liquid that is minimally soluble in water with a slightly unpleasant rancid-like smell and taste. Salts and esters of octanoic acid are known as octanoates or caprylates. The name of the related acyl group is octanoyl, capryloyl, or caprylyl. It is a common industrial chemical, which is produced by oxidation of the C8 aldehyde. Its compounds are found naturally in the milk of various mammals and as a minor constituent of coconut oil and palm kernel oil.

Two other acids are named after goats via the Latin word capra: caproic acid (C6) and capric acid (C10). Together, these three fatty acids comprise 15% of the fatty acids in goat milk fat.

== Metabolism ==
=== Octanoyl-mtACP ===
One of the products of the mitochondrial fatty acid synthesis (mtFAS) pathway is octanoic acid bound to the mitochondrial acyl carrier protein (mtACP), also referred to as octanoyl-mtACP. In the absence of a mitochondrial acyl-mtACP thioesterase—none has been identified in any animal species—octanoic acid remains attached to mtACP rather than being released as a free fatty acid. Octanoyl-mtACP serves as the precursor for the biosynthesis of lipoic acid, a vital cofactor required by several key mitochondrial enzymes complexes, including the pyruvate dehydrogenase complex (PDC), the α‑ketoglutarate dehydrogenase complex (OGDC), the 2-oxoadipate dehydrogenase complex (OADHC), the branched‑chain α‑ketoacid dehydrogenase complex (BCKDC), and the glycine cleavage system (GCS).

=== Octanoyl-CoA ===
Caprylic acid plays an important role in the body's regulation of energy input and output, a function which is performed by the hormone ghrelin. The sensation of hunger is a signal that the body requires an input of energy in the form of food consumption. Ghrelin stimulates hunger by triggering receptors in the hypothalamus. In order to activate these receptors, ghrelin must undergo a process called acylation in which it acquires an acyl group, and caprylic acid provides this by linking at a specific serine site on ghrelin molecules. Other fatty acids in the same position have similar effects on hunger.

== Uses ==
=== Industrial and commercial use ===
Caprylic acid is used commercially in the production of esters used in perfumery and also in the manufacture of dyes.

The acyl chloride of caprylic acid is used in the synthesis of perfluorooctanoic acid.

Caprylic acid is an antimicrobial pesticide used as a food contact surface sanitizer in commercial food handling establishments on dairy equipment, food processing equipment, breweries, wineries, and beverage processing plants. It is also used as disinfectant in health care facilities and public places. Caprylic acid is used as an algicide, bactericide, fungicide, and herbicide in nurseries, greenhouses, garden centers, and interiors, and on ornamentation. Products containing caprylic acid are formulated as soluble concentrate/liquids and ready-to-use liquids.

=== Dietary uses ===
Caprylic acid is taken as a dietary supplement. In the body, caprylic acid would be found as octanoate, or unprotonated caprylic acid.

Some studies have shown that medium-chain triglycerides (MCTs) can help in the process of excess calorie burning, and thus weight loss; however, a systematic review of the evidence concluded that the overall results are inconclusive. Interest in MCTs has been shown by endurance athletes and the bodybuilding community, but MCTs have not been found to be beneficial to exercise performance.

=== Medical uses ===
Caprylic acid has been studied as part of a ketogenic diet to treat children with intractable epilepsy. Caprylic acid is being researched as a treatment for essential tremor.

== See also ==
- List of saturated fatty acids
- List of carboxylic acids
