= Pentacosylic acid =

25-Carbon fatty acid

Names
- Preferred IUPAC name Pentacosanoic acid
- Other names Pentacosylic acid, Hyenic acid

Identifiers
CAS Number	506-38-7
3D model (JSmol)	Interactive image
Abbreviations	C25
Beilstein Reference	1797903
ChEBI	CHEBI:39420
ChEMBL	ChEMBL4303190
ChemSpider	10036
ECHA InfoCard	100.007.306
EC Number	208-036-0
PubChem CID	10468
UNII	4S768OX95G
CompTox Dashboard (EPA)	DTXSID8075049
- InChI: InChI=1S/C25H50O2/c1-2-3-4-5-6-7-8-9-10-11-12-13-14-15-16-17-18-19-20-21-22-23-24-25(26)27/h2-24H2,1H3,(H,26,27) Key: MWMPEAHGUXCSMY-UHFFFAOYSA-N; InChI=1S/C25H50O2/c1-2-3-4-5-6-7-8-9-10-11-12-13-14-15-16-17-18-19-20-21-22-23-24-25(26)27/h2-24H2,1H3,(H,26,27) Key: MWMPEAHGUXCSMY-UHFFFAOYSA-N
- SMILES: O=C(O)CCCCCCCCCCCCCCCCCCCCCCCC

Properties
Chemical formula	C_{25}H_{50}O_{2}
Molar mass	382.38 g/mol
- Except where otherwise noted, data are given for materials in their standard state (at 25 °C [77 °F], 100 kPa). Infobox references

Pentacosylic acid, also known as pentacosanoic acid or hyenic acid, is a 25-carbon long-chain saturated fatty acid with the chemical formula CH_{3}(CH_{2})_{23}COOH.

== See also ==
- List of saturated fatty acids
- Very long chain fatty acids
- List of carboxylic acids
