= Valeric acid =

Carboxylic acid – CH3(CH2)3COOH

- Valeric acid

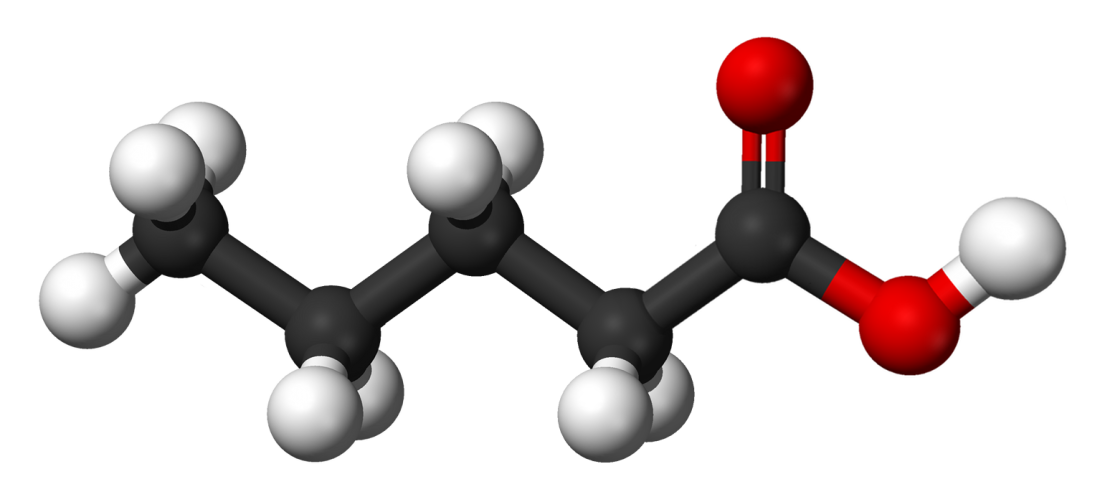

Names
- IUPAC name Pentanoic acid
- Systematic IUPAC name Pentanoic acid
- Other names: 1-Butanecarboxylic acid; Propylacetic acid; n-Pentanoic acid; Valerianic acid

Identifiers
CAS Number	Valeric acid: 109-52-4; Valerate: 10023-74-2
3D model (JSmol)	Valeric acid: Interactive image
ChEBI	Valeric acid: CHEBI:17418; Valerate: CHEBI:31011
ChEMBL	Valeric acid: ChEMBL268736
ChemSpider	Valeric acid: 7701; Valerate: 102757
ECHA InfoCard	100.003.344
EC Number	Valeric acid: 203-677-2
IUPHAR/BPS	Valeric acid: 1061
PubChem CID	Valeric acid: 7991; Valerate: 114781
RTECS number	Valeric acid: YV6100000
UNII	Valeric acid: GZK92PJM7B
UN number	3265
CompTox Dashboard (EPA)	Valeric acid: DTXSID7021655
- InChI: InChI=1S/C5H10O2/c1-2-3-4-5(6)7/h2-4H2,1H3,(H,6,7) Key: NQPDZGIKBAWPEJ-UHFFFAOYSA-N; Valeric acid: InChI=1/C5H10O2/c1-2-3-4-5(6)7/h2-4H2,1H3,(H,6,7) Key: NQPDZGIKBAWPEJ-UHFFFAOYAU
- SMILES: Valeric acid: CCCCC(O)=O

Properties
Chemical formula	CH_{3}(CH_{2})_{3}COOH
Molar mass	102.133 g·mol^{−1}
Appearance	Colorless liquid
Odor	Cheesy, acidic, rancid
Density	0.930 g/cm^{3}
Melting point	−34.5 °C (−30.1 °F; 238.7 K)
Boiling point	185 °C (365 °F; 458 K)
Solubility in water	4.0 g/100 mL (20 °C (68 °F))
log P	1.8
Vapor pressure	0.3 hPa (0.0044 psi) (20 °C (68 °F))
Acidity (pK_{a})	4.82
Magnetic susceptibility (χ)	−66.85×10^{−6} cm^{3}/mol
Refractive index (n_{D})	1.408
Viscosity	2.2 mPa·s (20 °C (68 °F))

Hazards
- GHS labelling
Pictograms	(GHS05: Corrosive)
Signal word	Danger
Hazard statements	H227, H314, H412
Precautionary statements	P210, P264, P273, P280, P301+P330+P331, P303+P361+P353, P304+P340+P310, P305+P351+P338+P310, P363, P370+P378, P403+P235, P405, P501
NFPA 704 (fire diamond)	3 2 0
Flash point	86 °C (187 °F; 359 K)
Autoignition temperature	440 °C (824 °F; 713 K)
Explosive limits	1.6% to 7.6%
- Lethal dose or concentration (LD, LC)
LD_{50} (median dose)	4600 mg/kg (oral, rat); >2 g/kg (dermal, rat)

Related compounds
Related compounds	Butyric acid; Caproic acid
- Except where otherwise noted, data are given for materials in their standard state (at 25 °C [77 °F], 100 kPa). Infobox references

Valeric acid or pentanoic acid is a straight-chain alkyl carboxylic acid with the chemical formula CH_{3}(CH_{2})_{3}COOH. Like other low-molecular-weight carboxylic acids, it has an unpleasant odor. It is found in the perennial flowering plant Valeriana officinalis, from which it gets its name. Its primary use is in the synthesis of its esters. Salts and esters of valeric acid are known as valerates or pentanoates. Volatile esters of valeric acid tend to have pleasant odors and are used in perfumes and cosmetics. Several, including ethyl valerate and pentyl valerate are used as food additives because of their fruity flavors.

== History ==
Valeric acid is a minor constituent of the perennial flowering plant valerian (Valeriana officinalis), from which it gets its name. It was first isolated in the 19th century. The dried root of this plant has been used medicinally since antiquity. The related isovaleric acid shares its unpleasant odor and their chemical identity was investigated by oxidation of the components of fusel alcohol, which includes the five-carbon amyl alcohols. Valeric acid is one volatile component in swine manure. Other components include other carboxylic acids, skatole, trimethyl amine, and isovaleric acid. It is also a flavor component in some foods.

== Manufacture ==
In industry, valeric acid is produced by the oxo process from 1-butene and syngas, forming pentanal, which is oxidised to the final product.

H_{2} + CO + CH_{3}CH_{2}CHCH_{2} → CH_{3}(CH_{2})_{3}CHO → CH_{3}(CH_{2})_{3}COOH

It can also be produced from biomass-derived sugars via levulinic acid and this alternative has received considerable attention as a way to produce biofuels.

Valeric acid can also be prepared by oxidizing 1-pentanol with potassium permanganate according to the following reaction:

CH_{3}(CH_{2})_{4}OH + KMnO_{4} + H_{2}SO_{4} → CH_{3}(CH_{2})_{3}COOH + MnSO_{4} + K_{2}SO_{4} + H_{2}O

== Reactions ==
Valeric acid reacts as a typical carboxylic acid: it can form amide, ester, anhydride, and chloride derivatives. The latter, valeryl chloride is commonly used as the intermediate to obtain the others.

== Uses ==
Valeric acid occurs naturally in some foods but is also used as a food additive. Its safety in this application was reviewed by an FAO and WHO panel, who concluded that there were no safety concerns at the likely levels of intake. The compound is used for the preparation of derivatives, notably its volatile esters which, unlike the parent acid, have pleasant odors and fruity flavors and hence find applications in perfumes, cosmetics and foodstuffs. Typical examples are the methyl valerates, ethyl valerates, and pentyl valerates.

== Biology ==
In humans, valeric acid is a minor product of the gut microbiome and can also be produced by metabolism of its esters found in food. The restoration of levels of this acid in the gut has been suggested as the mechanism that results in control of Clostridioides difficile infection after fecal microbiota transplant.

Valerate has been found to act as a histone deacetylase (HDAC) inhibitor and may act as a biased agonist of the GABA_{B} receptor. It has been found to increase γ-aminobutyric acid (GABA) levels in feces, blood, and brain in rodents. The mechanism of this effect is unknown. However, valeric acid is structurally similar to valproic acid, which is known to act as a GABA transaminase (GABA-T) inhibitor, though valeric acid has yet to be assessed at this potential target.

== Valerate salts and esters ==
The valerate, or pentanoate, ion is C_{4}H_{9}COO^{−}, the conjugate base of valeric acid. It is the form found in biological systems at physiological pH. A valerate, or pentanoate, compound is a carboxylate salt or ester of valeric acid. Many steroid-based pharmaceuticals, for example ones based on betamethasone or hydrocortisone, include the steroid as the valerate ester.

=== Examples ===
- Estradiol valerate
- Testosterone valerate
- Methyl valerate
- Ethyl valerate
- Pentyl valerate
- Betamethasone valerate
- Hydrocortisone valerate

== See also ==
- List of saturated fatty acids
- List of carboxylic acids
- 4-Hydroxy-4-methylpentanoic acid
- Pivalic acid (2,2-dimethylpropanoic acid)
- 3-Methylbutanoic acid, also called isovaleric acid
- Valproic acid
