= Mycobacterium brumae =

Scientific classification
- Domain: Bacteria
- Kingdom: Bacillati
- Phylum: Actinomycetota
- Class: Actinomycetia
- Order: Mycobacteriales
- Family: Mycobacteriaceae
- Genus: Mycobacterium
- Species: M. brumae

Binomial name
- Mycobacterium brumae Luquin et al. 1993, ATCC 51384

Species of bacterium

Mycobacterium brumae is a rapidly growing environmental mycobacterial species identified in 1993. Aside from one 2004 report of a catheter related bloodstream infection no other infections by this organism have been reported. It was first isolated from water, soil and one human sputum sample in Spain.

== Description ==
Microscopy

- Gram-positive, nonmotile, mostly strongly acid-fast rods, 2.0-2.5 μm long and 0.3 to 0.5 μm wide.

Colony characteristics

- Flat, rough, and undulated yellow, nonphotochromogenic colonies

Physiology

- Rapid growth occurs within 5 days at 25 °C, 30 °C and 37 °C, but not at 45 °C on Löwenstein-Jensen medium and Middlebrook 7H10 agar.
- Production of thermostable catalase.
- Positive for β-glucosidase, nitrate reductase, penicillinase, trehalase, urease and iron uptake.
- Tween 80 hydrolysis after 10 days.
- No accumulation of niacin, no degradation of salicylate to catechol.
- No growth on MacConkey agar without crystal violet.

== Pathogenesis ==
- In 2004 a patient with breast cancer was reported to have a catheter related bloodstream infection.

== Type strain ==
- First isolated from water, soil and human sputum samples in Barcelona, Spain.
- Strain CR-270 = ATCC 51384 = CCUG 37586 = CIP 103465 = DSM 44177 = JCM 12273.
