= Lignoceric acid =

24-Carbon fatty acid

Names
- Preferred IUPAC name Tetracosanoic acid
- Other names C24:0 (Lipid numbers)

Identifiers
CAS Number	557-59-5
3D model (JSmol)	Interactive image
ChEBI	CHEBI:28866
ChEMBL	ChEMBL1173620
ChemSpider	10724
ECHA InfoCard	100.008.347
KEGG	C08320
PubChem CID	11197
UNII	RK3VCW5Y1L
CompTox Dashboard (EPA)	DTXSID6021664
- InChI: InChI=1S/C24H48O2/c1-2-3-4-5-6-7-8-9-10-11-12-13-14-15-16-17-18-19-20-21-22-23-24(25)26/h2-23H2,1H3,(H,25,26) Key: QZZGJDVWLFXDLK-UHFFFAOYSA-N; InChI=1/C24H48O2/c1-2-3-4-5-6-7-8-9-10-11-12-13-14-15-16-17-18-19-20-21-22-23-24(25)26/h2-23H2,1H3,(H,25,26) Key: QZZGJDVWLFXDLK-UHFFFAOYAH
- SMILES: O=C(O)CCCCCCCCCCCCCCCCCCCCCCC

Properties
Chemical formula	C_{24}H_{48}O_{2}
Molar mass	368.63 g/mol
Melting point	84.2 °C (183.6 °F; 357.3 K)

Related compounds
Related Fatty acids	Behenic acid (C22:0); Cerotic acid (C26:0)
- Except where otherwise noted, data are given for materials in their standard state (at 25 °C [77 °F], 100 kPa). verify (what is ?) Infobox references

Lignoceric acid, or tetracosanoic acid, is the saturated fatty acid with formula C_{23}H_{47}COOH. It is found in wood tar, various cerebrosides, and in small amounts in most natural fats. The fatty acids of peanut oil contain small amounts of lignoceric acid (1.1% – 2.2%). This fatty acid is also a byproduct of lignin production.

Reduction of lignoceric acid yields lignoceryl alcohol.

== See also ==
- List of saturated fatty acids
