= Nonadecylic acid =

19-Carbon fatty acid

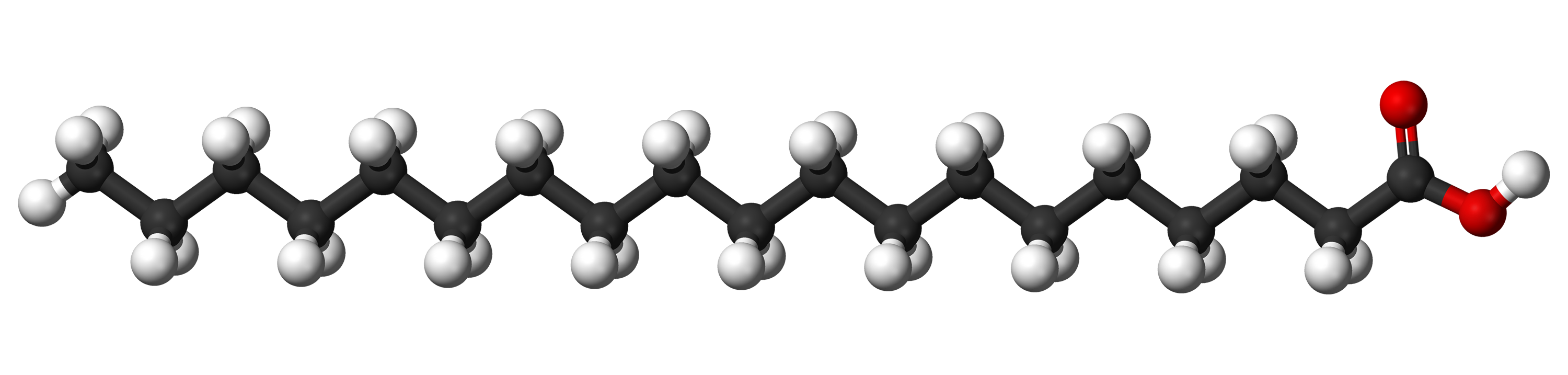

Names
- IUPAC name Nonadecanoic acid

Identifiers
CAS Number	646-30-0
3D model (JSmol)	Interactive image
Beilstein Reference	1786261
ChEBI	CHEBI:39246
ChEMBL	ChEMBL1169674
ChemSpider	12071
ECHA InfoCard	100.010.431
EC Number	211-472-4
PubChem CID	12591
UNII	H6M3VYC62P
CompTox Dashboard (EPA)	DTXSID3060954
- InChI: InChI=1S/C19H38O2/c1-2-3-4-5-6-7-8-9-10-11-12-13-14-15-16-17-18-19(20)21/h2-18H2,1H3,(H,20,21) Key: ISYWECDDZWTKFF-UHFFFAOYSA-N
- SMILES: O=C(O)CCCCCCCCCCCCCCCCCC

Properties
Chemical formula	CH_{3}(CH_{2})_{17}COOH
Molar mass	298.50382 g/mol
Appearance	White flakes or powder
Melting point	68 to 70 °C (154 to 158 °F; 341 to 343 K)
Boiling point	236 °C (457 °F; 509 K) (10 mmHg); 297 °C (100 mmHg)
Solubility in water	Insoluble

Hazards
- GHS labelling
Pictograms	(GHS07: Exclamation mark)
Signal word	Warning
Hazard statements	H315, H319, H335
Precautionary statements	P261, P264, P271, P280, P302+P352, P304+P340, P305+P351+P338, P312, P321, P332+P313, P337+P313, P362, P403+P233, P405, P501
- Except where otherwise noted, data are given for materials in their standard state (at 25 °C [77 °F], 100 kPa). verify (what is ?) Infobox references

Nonadecylic acid, or nonadecanoic acid, is a 19-carbon saturated fatty acid with the chemical formula CH_{3}(CH_{2})_{17}COOH. It forms salts called nonadecylates. Nonadecylic acid can be found in fats and vegetable oils, although it is rare.

It is also present in the world of insects as the major constituent of the substance secreted by soldiers of the termite Rhinotermes marginalis for defence purposes.

Nonadecanoic acid has found applications in the field of metal lubrication.

The compound can be prepared by permanganate oxidation of 1-eicosene.

== See also ==
- List of saturated fatty acids
