= Margaric acid =

17-Carbon fatty acid

- Heptadecanoic acid

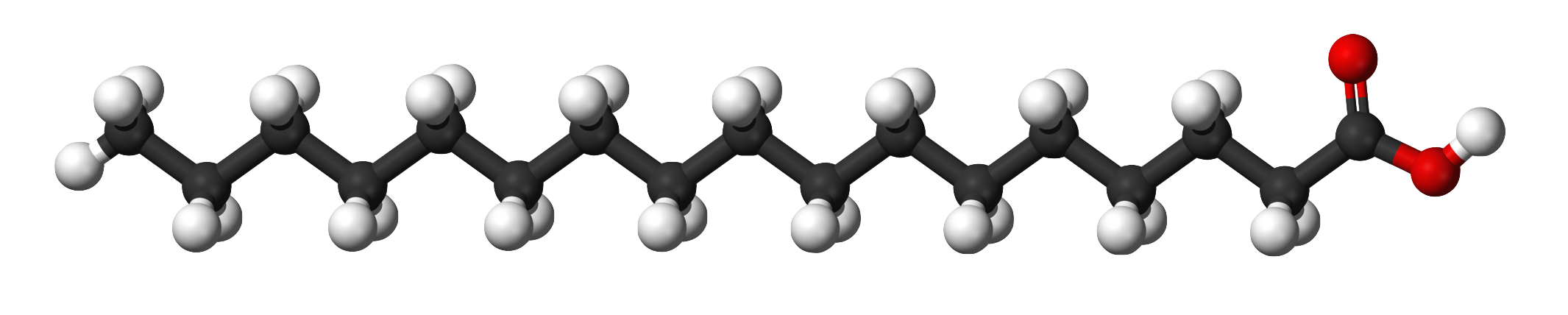

Names
- Preferred IUPAC name Heptadecanoic acid
- Other names Heptadecylic acid; Daturic acid; Margarinic acid; 17:0 (Lipid numbers)

Identifiers
CAS Number	506-12-7
3D model (JSmol)	Interactive image
Beilstein Reference	1781004
ChEBI	CHEBI:32365
ChEMBL	ChEMBL1172910
ChemSpider	10033
ECHA InfoCard	100.007.298
EC Number	208-027-1
Gmelin Reference	253195
PubChem CID	10465
UNII	V987Y9OZ8L
CompTox Dashboard (EPA)	DTXSID5021596
- InChI: InChI=1S/C17H32O2/c1-2-3-4-5-6-7-8-9-10-11-12-13-14-15-16-17(18)19/h2-16H2,1H3,(H,18,19) Key: KEMQGTRYUADPNZ-UHFFFAOYSA-N; InChI=1/C17H32O2/c1-2-3-4-5-6-7-8-9-10-11-12-13-14-15-16-17(18)19/h2-16H2,1H3,(H,18,19) Key: KEMQGTRYUADPNZ-UHFFFAOYAT
- SMILES: O=C(O)CCCCCCCCCCCCCCCC

Properties
Chemical formula	C_{17}H_{34}O_{2}
Molar mass	270.45 g/mol
Appearance	White crystals
Density	0.853 g/cm^{3}
Melting point	61.3 °C (142.3 °F; 334.4 K)
Boiling point	227 °C (441 °F; 500 K) 100 mmHg
Solubility in water	insoluble

Hazards
- GHS labelling
Pictograms	(GHS07: Exclamation mark)
Signal word	Warning
Hazard statements	H315, H319, H335
Precautionary statements	P261, P264, P271, P280, P302+P352, P304+P340, P305+P351+P338, P312, P321, P332+P313, P337+P313, P362, P403+P233, P405, P501

Related compounds
Related fatty acids	Palmitic acid Stearic acid
Related compounds	Heptadecanol; Heptadecanal
- Except where otherwise noted, data are given for materials in their standard state (at 25 °C [77 °F], 100 kPa). verify (what is ?) Infobox references

Margaric acid, or heptadecanoic acid, is a saturated fatty acid. Its molecular formula is CH_{3}(CH_{2})_{15}CO_{2}H. Classified as an odd-chain fatty acid, it occurs as a trace component of the fat and milkfat of ruminants. Salts and esters of margaric acid are called heptadecanoates.

Its name is derived from the Ancient Greek μάργαρος (márgar(on)), meaning "pearl(y)", due to its appearance. The name is, in turn, the root of "margarine".

== Semiochemistry ==
For many species, margaric acid plays a role as a semiochemical. Specifically, it possesses pheromonic and allomonic properties. Margaric acid has been identified in the subcaudal gland secretions of the European badger (Meles meles) and in the occipital gland secretions of male Bactrian camels (Camelus bactrianus) where it is one of the many pheromonic chemicals responsible for aiding in the finding and selection of mates.

Margaric acid is an attractant of the khapra beetle (Trogoderma granarium) and the yellow fever mosquito (Aedes aegypti) but is a repellent of the common house mosquito (Culex pipiens).

Margaric acid is also found in the precloacal gland secretions of many reptiles belonging to the order squamata, including the common leopard gecko (Eublepharis macularius) and the European viper (Vipera berus), where it is used for the identification of sexual partners.

== Unsaturated forms ==
Unsaturated derivatives of margaric acid are found in nature, although rarely. Unsaturation occurs at position 9 or both at 9 and 12 positions of the fatty chain giving heptadecenoic (C17:1) and heptadecadienoic (C17:2) acids, respectively. C17:1 cis-9 (ω-8) is found at trace amounts in ruminant fats and some varieties of olive oils. Minor amounts (< 1%) of C17:1 cis-10 and C17:2 cis-8,11 were detected in seed oil of portia tree (Thespesia populnea).

== Rarity in vegetable and animal fats ==
Margaric acid is rare in animals and vegetables. In the 19th and early 20th centuries, however, the acid was often identified as a significant component of natural fats. Most likely, these were cases of misidentifying a eutectic mixture of palmitic and stearic acids.

== See also ==
- List of saturated fatty acids
- List of carboxylic acids
- Pentadecylic acid
