= Pentadecylic acid =

15-Carbon fatty acid

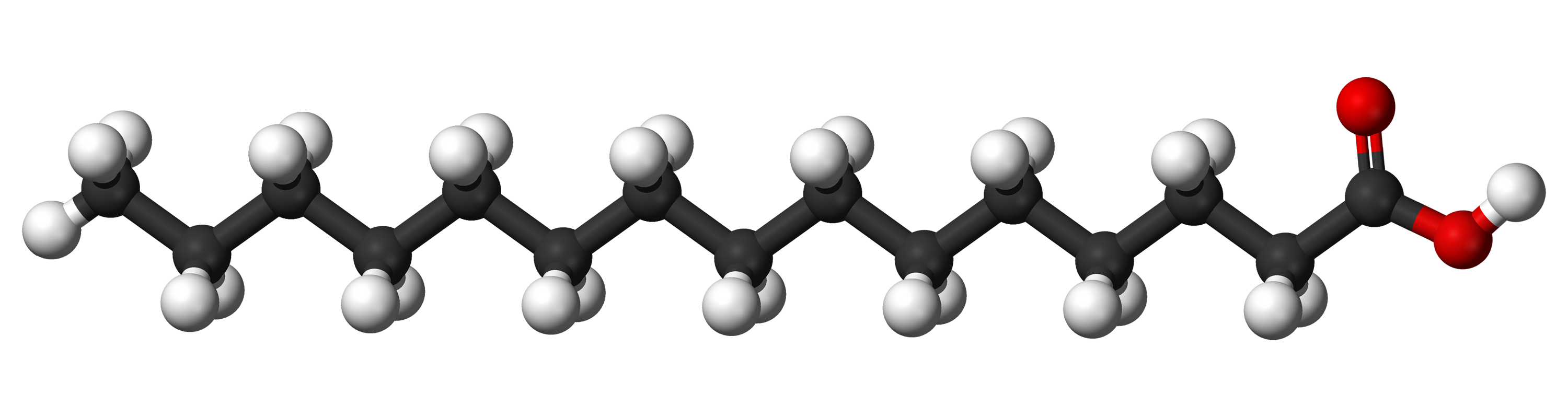

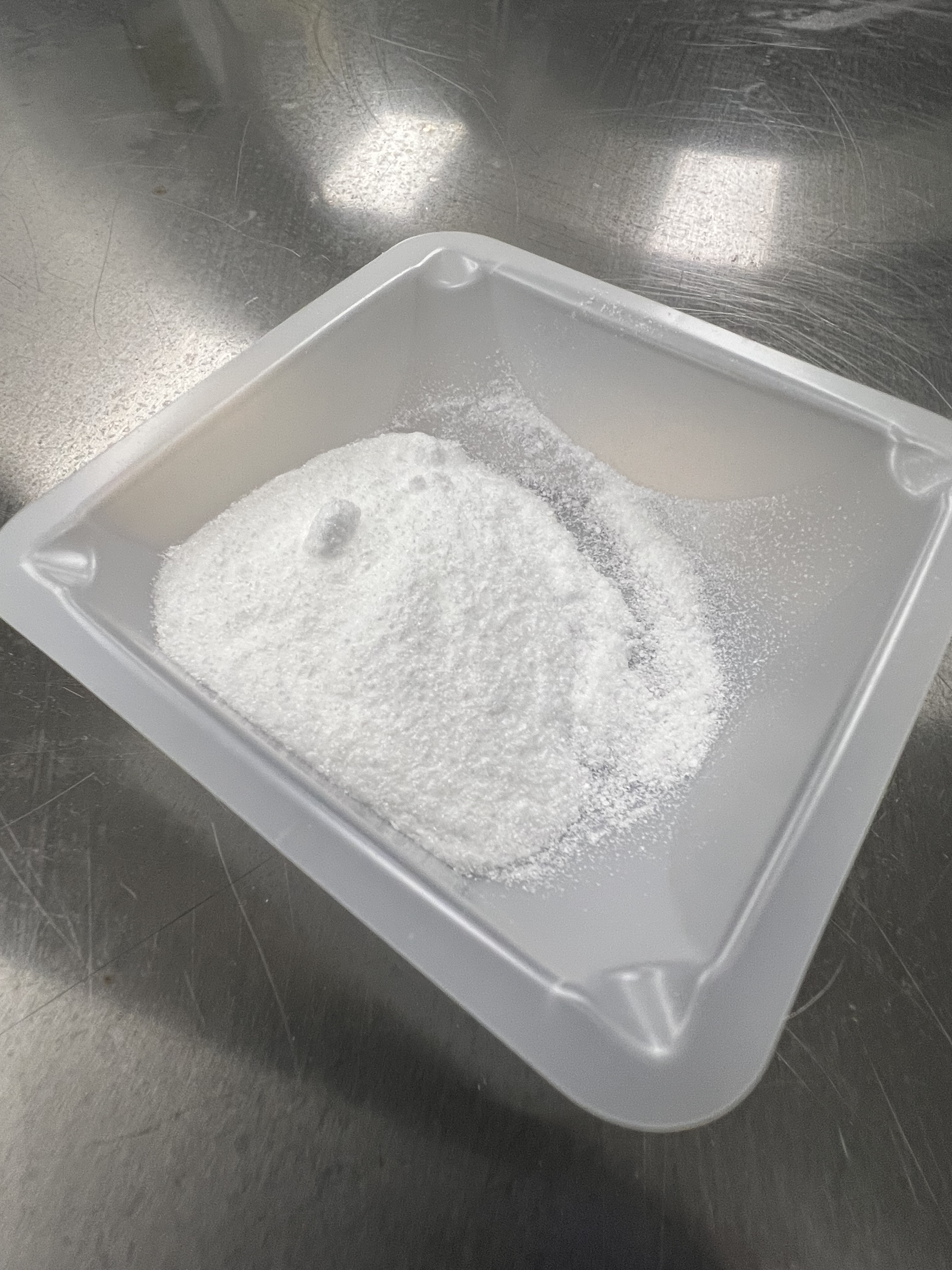
- Pentadecanoic acid powder in weighboat

Names
- Preferred IUPAC name Pentadecanoic acid
- Other names n-Pentadecanoic acid; C15:0 (Lipid numbers)

Identifiers
CAS Number	1002-84-2
3D model (JSmol)	Interactive image
ChEBI	CHEBI:42504
ChemSpider	13249
ECHA InfoCard	100.012.448
PubChem CID	13849
UNII	CCW02D961F
CompTox Dashboard (EPA)	DTXSID2021652
- InChI: InChI=1S/C15H30O2/c1-2-3-4-5-6-7-8-9-10-11-12-13-14-15(16)17/h2-14H2,1H3,(H,16,17)
- SMILES: O=C(O)CCCCCCCCCCCCCC

Properties
Chemical formula	C_{15}H_{30}O_{2}
Molar mass	242.403 g·mol^{−1}
Density	0.842 g/cm^{3}
Melting point	51 to 53 °C (124 to 127 °F; 324 to 326 K)
Boiling point	257 °C (495 °F; 530 K) (100 mmHg)

Hazards
- GHS labelling
Pictograms	(GHS07: Exclamation mark)
Signal word	Warning
Hazard statements	H315, H319, H335
Precautionary statements	P261, P264, P264+P265, P271, P280, P302+P352, P304+P340, P305+P351+P338, P319, P321, P332+P317, P337+P317, P362+P364, P403+P233, P405, P501

Related compounds
Related compounds	Tetradecanoic acid, Hexadecanoic acid
- Except where otherwise noted, data are given for materials in their standard state (at 25 °C [77 °F], 100 kPa). Infobox references

Pentadecylic acid (also known as pentadecanoic acid or C15:0), is an odd-chain saturated fatty acid. Its molecular formula is CH_{3}(CH_{2})_{13}CO_{2}H. It is a colorless solid.

A laboratory preparation involves permanganate oxidation of 1-hexadecene (CH_{3}(CH_{2})_{13}CH=CH_{2}).

It is one of the most common odd-chain fatty acids, which are rare in nature. Pentadecylic acid is found primarily in dairy fat, as well as in ruminant meat and some fish and plants. The butterfat in cow milk is its major dietary source, comprising 1.2% of cow milk fat.

Rare genetic disorders causing unusually high concentrations of C15:0 and C17:0, including Refsum disease, Zellweger syndrome, and propionic acidemia, confirmed endogenous synthesis of these odd-chain FAs in humans, involving alpha oxidation.

== Research ==
Pentadecanoic acid has been compared to eicosapentaenoic acid (EPA) to evaluate the possibility that pentadecanoic acid is a previously unrecognized essential fatty acid.

== See also ==
- List of saturated fatty acids
- List of carboxylic acids
- Margaric acid
