= Tridecylic acid =

13-Carbon fatty acid

- Skeletal formula of tridecylic acid

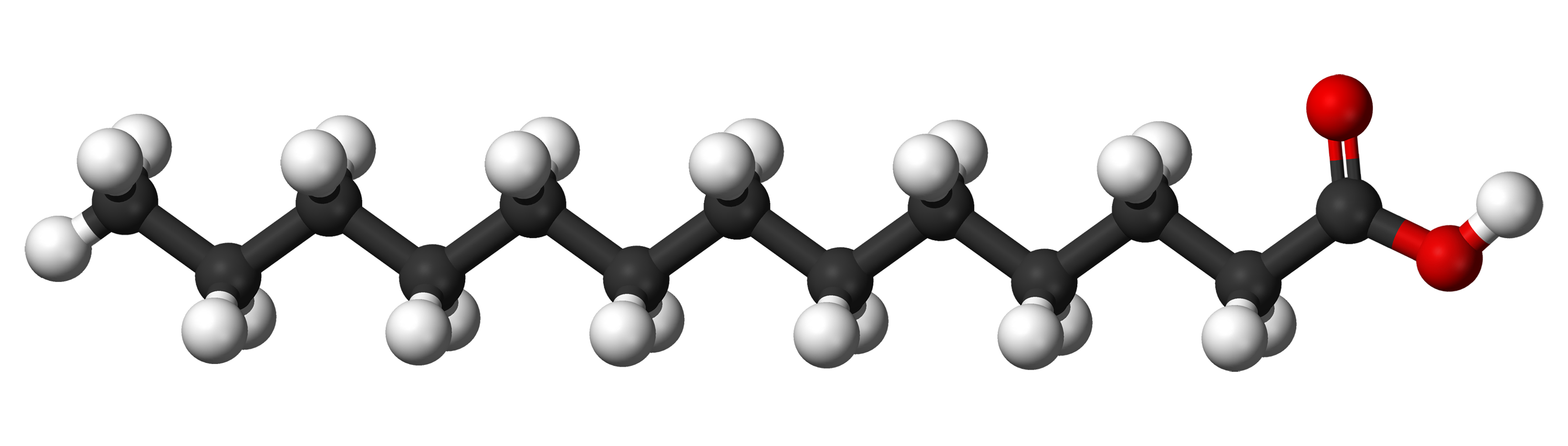
- Ball-and-sitck model of tridecylic acid

Names
- Preferred IUPAC name Tridecanoic acid
- Other names C13:0 (Lipid numbers)

Identifiers
CAS Number	638-53-9
3D model (JSmol)	Interactive image
ChEBI	CHEBI:45919
ChEMBL	ChEMBL107874
ChemSpider	12013; 12013
ECHA InfoCard	100.010.311
EC Number	211-341-1
PubChem CID	12530
RTECS number	YD3850000
UNII	19936LIY2V
CompTox Dashboard (EPA)	DTXSID4021684
- InChI: InChI=1S/C13H26O2/c1-2-3-4-5-6-7-8-9-10-11-12-13(14)15/h2-12H2,1H3,(H,14,15) Key: SZHOJFHSIKHZHA-UHFFFAOYSA-N
- SMILES: O=C(O)CCCCCCCCCCCC

Properties
Chemical formula	C_{13}H_{26}O_{2}
Molar mass	214.349 g·mol^{−1}
Appearance	White crystals or powder
Odor	Waxy-type
Density	0.983 g/cm^{3} (37 °C); 0.8458 g/cm^{3} (80 °C)
Melting point	41.5 °C (106.7 °F; 314.6 K)
Boiling point	236 °C (457 °F; 509 K) at 100 mmHg; 140 °C (284 °F; 413 K) at 1 mmHg
Solubility in water	21 mg/L (0 °C); 33 mg/L (20 °C); 38 mg/L (30 °C); 53 mg/L (60 °C)
Solubility	Soluble in alcohol, ether, CH_{3}COOH
Solubility in acetone	7.52 g/100 g (0 °C); 78.6 g/100 g (20 °C); 316 g/100 g (30 °C); 8.23 kg/100 g (40 °C)
Solubility in methanol	12.6 g/100 g (0 °C); 148 g/100 g (20 °C); 515 g/100 g (30 °C)
Solubility in benzene	42.4 g/100 g (10 °C); 117 g/100 g (20 °C); 354 g/100 g (30 °C)
Solubility in ethyl acetate	10.1 g/100 g (0 °C); 70 g/100 g (20 °C); 281 g/100 g (30 °C)
Vapor pressure	0.01 kPa (109 °C); 0.47 kPa (160 °C); 3.21 kPa (200 °C); 100 kPa (311.5 °C)
Refractive index (n_{D})	1.4286 (50 °C)
Viscosity	0.583 cP (120 °C); 0.3991 cP (160 °C); 0.2934 cP (200 °C)

Structure
Crystal structure	Monoclinic (37 °C)
Space group	C2/c
Lattice constant	a = 59.88 Å, b = 4.9425 Å, c = 9.8118 Å α = 90°, β = 93.8°, γ = 90°

Thermochemistry
Heat capacity (C)	387.6 J/mol·K
Std enthalpy of formation (Δ_{f}H^{⦵}_{298})	−807.2 kJ/mol (liquid)
Std enthalpy of combustion (Δ_{c}H^{⦵}_{298})	8024.2 kJ/mol (liquid)

Hazards
- Occupational safety and health (OHS/OSH)
Main hazards	Irritant
- GHS labelling
Pictograms	(GHS07: Exclamation mark)
Signal word	Warning
Hazard statements	H315, H319, H335
Precautionary statements	P261, P305+P351+P338
NFPA 704 (fire diamond)	2 1 0
Flash point	113 °C (235 °F; 386 K)
- Lethal dose or concentration (LD, LC)
LD_{50} (median dose)	130 mg/kg (mice, intravenous)

Related compounds
Related compounds	Dodecanoic acid, Tetradecanoic acid
- Except where otherwise noted, data are given for materials in their standard state (at 25 °C [77 °F], 100 kPa). verify (what is ?) Infobox references

Tridecylic acid, or tridecanoic acid, also reffred to as C13 fatty acid, is an organic compound with the formula CH_{3}(CH_{2})_{11}CO_{2}H. It is a 13-carbon saturated fatty acid. It is a white solid.

It is an odd-chained saturated fatty acid (OCFA) found in human blood plasma. Thought, like other OCFAs in blood plasma, to originate mainly from rumen or gut-microbial lipogenesis, its metabolic role needs further study.

A laboratory preparation involves permanganate oxidation of 1-tetradecene (CH_{3}(CH_{2})_{12}CH=CH_{2}).

== See also ==
- List of saturated fatty acids
