= Lacceroic acid =

32-Carbon fatty acid

Names
- Preferred IUPAC name Dotriacontanoic acid

Identifiers
CAS Number	3625-52-3
3D model (JSmol)	Interactive image
ChEBI	CHEBI:76215
ChemSpider	18168
PubChem CID	19255
UNII	PB0234915O
CompTox Dashboard (EPA)	DTXSID30189791
- InChI: InChI=1S/C32H64O2/c1-2-3-4-5-6-7-8-9-10-11-12-13-14-15-16-17-18-19-20-21-22-23-24-25-26-27-28-29-30-31-32(33)34/h2-31H2,1H3,(H,33,34) Key: ICAIHSUWWZJGHD-UHFFFAOYSA-N; InChI=1/C32H64O2/c1-2-3-4-5-6-7-8-9-10-11-12-13-14-15-16-17-18-19-20-21-22-23-24-25-26-27-28-29-30-31-32(33)34/h2-31H2,1H3,(H,33,34) Key: ICAIHSUWWZJGHD-UHFFFAOYAW
- SMILES: CCCCCCCCCCCCCCCCCCCCCCCCCCCCCCCC(=O)O

Properties
Chemical formula	C_{32}H_{64}O_{2}
Molar mass	480.85 g/mol
- Except where otherwise noted, data are given for materials in their standard state (at 25 °C [77 °F], 100 kPa). verify (what is ?) Infobox references

Lacceroic acid (or dotriacontanoic acid) is a saturated fatty acid.

== Sources ==
Lacceroic acid can be derived by saponification of lacceryl lacceroate or by oxidation of 1-dotriacontanol (lacceryl) and purification of the product. It can also be isolated from stick lac wax, from which the name is derived.

== Derivatives ==
Ethyl lacceroate can be obtained as a crystalline solid (rhombic plates, mp 76 °C) by the action of HCl gas on lacceroic acid in boiling absolute alcohol.

== See also ==
- List of saturated fatty acids
