= Carboxylic acid =

Organic compound containing a –C(=O)OH group

Structure of a carboxylic acid

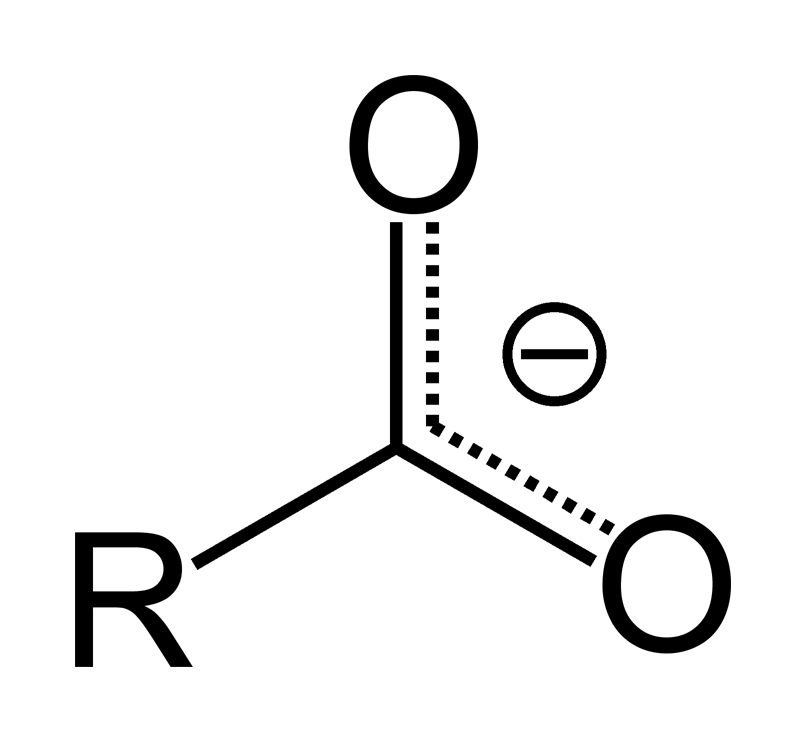
Carboxylate anion

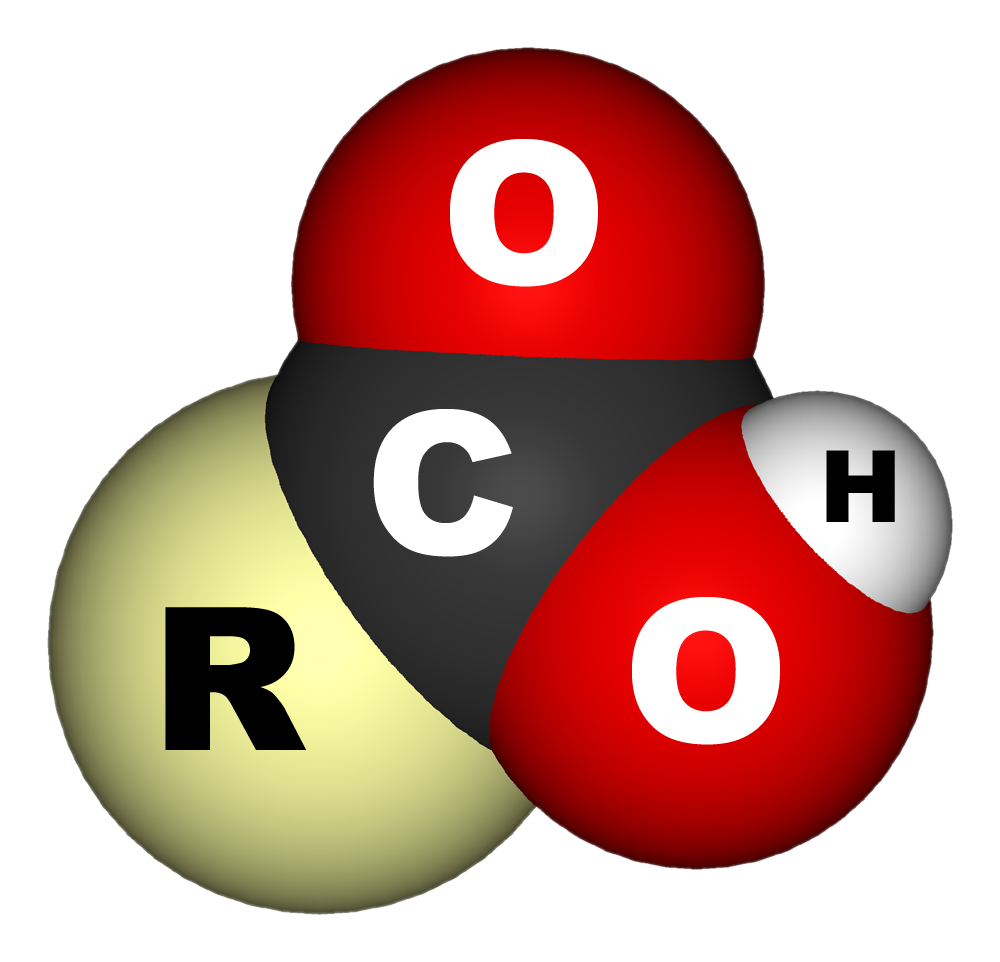
3D structure of a carboxylic acid

In organic chemistry, a carboxylic acid is a polar, organic acid that contains a carboxyl group (−C(=O)−OH) attached to an R-group. The general formula of a carboxylic acid is often written as R−COOH or R−CO_{2}H, sometimes as R−C(O)OH, with R referring to an organyl group (e.g., alkyl, alkenyl, aryl), or hydrogen, or other groups. Carboxylic acids occur widely. Important examples include the amino acids and fatty acids. Deprotonation of a carboxylic acid gives a carboxylate anion. Carboxylic acids are often considered weak acids as they only partially ionise (dissociate) in water.

== Examples and nomenclature ==
Carboxylic acids are commonly identified by their trivial names. They often have the suffix -ic acid. IUPAC-recommended names also exist; in this system, carboxylic acids have an -oic acid suffix. For example, butyric acid (CH_{3}CH_{2}CH_{2}CO_{2}H) is butanoic acid by IUPAC guidelines. For nomenclature of complex molecules containing a carboxylic acid, the carboxyl can be considered position one of the parent chain even if there are other substituents, such as 3-chloropropanoic acid. Alternately, it can be named as a "carboxy" or "carboxylic acid" substituent on another parent structure, such as 2-carboxyfuran.

The carboxylate anion (R−COO^{−} or R−CO^{−}_{2}) of a carboxylic acid is usually named with the suffix -ate, in keeping with the general pattern of -ic acid and -ate for a conjugate acid and its conjugate base, respectively. For example, the conjugate base of acetic acid is acetate.

Carbonic acid, which occurs in bicarbonate buffer systems in nature, is not generally classed as one of the carboxylic acids, despite it having a moiety that looks like a COOH group.

Straight-chain, saturated carboxylic acids (alkanoic acids)
Carbon atoms	Common name	IUPAC name	Chemical formula	Common location or use
1	Formic acid	Methanoic acid	HCOOH	Insect stings
2	Acetic acid	Ethanoic acid	CH_{3}COOH	Vinegar
3	Propionic acid	Propanoic acid	CH_{3}CH_{2}COOH	Preservative for stored grains, body odour, milk, butter, cheese
4	Butyric acid	Butanoic acid	CH_{3}(CH_{2})_{2}COOH	Butter
5	Valeric acid	Pentanoic acid	CH_{3}(CH_{2})_{3}COOH	Valerian plant
6	Caproic acid	Hexanoic acid	CH_{3}(CH_{2})_{4}COOH	Goat fat
7	Enanthic acid	Heptanoic acid	CH_{3}(CH_{2})_{5}COOH	Fragrance
8	Caprylic acid	Octanoic acid	CH_{3}(CH_{2})_{6}COOH	Coconuts
9	Pelargonic acid	Nonanoic acid	CH_{3}(CH_{2})_{7}COOH	Pelargonium plant
10	Capric acid	Decanoic acid	CH_{3}(CH_{2})_{8}COOH	Coconut and Palm kernel oil
11	Undecylic acid	Undecanoic acid	CH_{3}(CH_{2})_{9}COOH	Anti-fungal agent
12	Lauric acid	Dodecanoic acid	CH_{3}(CH_{2})_{10}COOH	Coconut oil and hand wash soaps
13	Tridecylic acid	Tridecanoic acid	CH_{3}(CH_{2})_{11}COOH	Plant metabolite
14	Myristic acid	Tetradecanoic acid	CH_{3}(CH_{2})_{12}COOH	Nutmeg
15	Pentadecylic acid	Pentadecanoic acid	CH_{3}(CH_{2})_{13}COOH	Milk fat
16	Palmitic acid	Hexadecanoic acid	CH_{3}(CH_{2})_{14}COOH	Palm oil
17	Margaric acid	Heptadecanoic acid	CH_{3}(CH_{2})_{15}COOH	Pheromone in various animals
18	Stearic acid	Octadecanoic acid	CH_{3}(CH_{2})_{16}COOH	Chocolate, waxes, soaps, and oils
19	Nonadecylic acid	Nonadecanoic acid	CH_{3}(CH_{2})_{17}COOH	Fats, vegetable oils, pheromone
20	Arachidic acid	Icosanoic acid	CH_{3}(CH_{2})_{18}COOH	Peanut oil

Other carboxylic acids
Compound class	Members
unsaturated monocarboxylic acids	acrylic acid (2-propenoic acid) – CH_{2}=CH−COOH, used in polymer synthesis
Fatty acids	medium to long-chain saturated and unsaturated monocarboxylic acids, with even number of carbons; examples: docosahexaenoic acid and eicosapentaenoic acid (nutritional supplements)
Amino acids	the building-blocks of proteins
Keto acids	acids of biochemical significance that contain a ketone group; examples: acetoacetic acid and pyruvic acid
Aromatic carboxylic acids	containing at least one aromatic ring; examples: benzoic acid – the sodium salt of benzoic acid is used as a food preservative; salicylic acid – a beta-hydroxy type found in many skin-care products; phenyl alkanoic acids – the class of compounds where a phenyl group is attached to a carboxylic acid
Dicarboxylic acids	containing two carboxyl groups; examples: adipic acid the monomer used to produce nylon and aldaric acid – a family of sugar acids
Tricarboxylic acids	containing three carboxyl groups; examples: citric acid – found in citrus fruits and isocitric acid
Alpha hydroxy acids	containing a hydroxy group in the first position; examples: glyceric acid, glycolic acid and lactic acid (2-hydroxypropanoic acid) – found in sour milk, tartaric acid – found in wine
Beta hydroxy acids	containing a hydroxy group in the second position
Omega hydroxy acids	containing a hydroxy group beyond the first or second position
Divinylether fatty acids	containing a doubly unsaturated carbon chain attached via an ether bond to a fatty acid, found in some plants

== Physical properties ==
=== Solubility ===
Carboxylic acids are polar. Because they are both hydrogen-bond acceptors (the carbonyl −C(=O)−) and hydrogen-bond donors (the hydroxyl −OH), they also participate in hydrogen bonding. Together, the hydroxyl and carbonyl group form the functional group carboxyl. Carboxylic acids usually exist as dimers in nonpolar media due to their tendency to "self-associate". Smaller carboxylic acids (1 to 5 carbons) are soluble in water, whereas bigger carboxylic acids have limited solubility due to the increasing hydrophobic nature of the alkyl chain. These longer chain acids tend to be soluble in less-polar solvents such as ethers and alcohols. Aqueous sodium hydroxide and carboxylic acids, even hydrophobic ones, react to yield water-soluble sodium salts. For example, enanthic acid has a low solubility in water (0.2 g/L), but its sodium salt is very soluble in water.

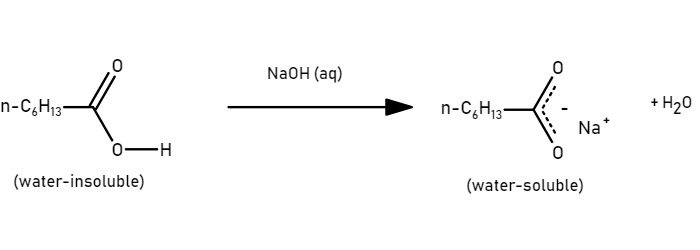

=== Boiling points ===
Carboxylic acids tend to have higher boiling points than water, because of their greater surface areas and their tendency to form stabilized dimers through hydrogen bonds. For boiling to occur, either the dimer bonds must be broken or the entire dimer arrangement must be vaporized, increasing the enthalpy of vaporization requirements significantly.

Carboxylic acid dimers

=== Acidity ===
Carboxylic acids are Brønsted–Lowry acids because they are proton (H^{+}) donors. They are the most common type of organic acid.

Carboxylic acids are typically weak acids, meaning that they only partially dissociate into [H_{3}O]^{+} cations and R−CO^{−}_{2} anions in neutral aqueous solution. For example, at room temperature, in a 1-molar solution of acetic acid, only 0.001% of the acid are dissociated (i.e. 10^{−5} moles out of 1 mol). Electron-withdrawing substituents such as trifluoromethyl (−CF_{3}) give stronger acids (the pK_{a} of acetic acid is 4.76 whereas trifluoroacetic acid, with a trifluoromethyl substituent, has a pK_{a} of 0.23). Electron-donating substituents give weaker acids (the pK_{a} of formic acid is 3.75 whereas acetic acid, with a methyl substituent, has a pK_{a} of 4.76)

Carboxylic acid	pK_{a}
Formic acid (HCO_{2}H)	3.75
Chloroformic acid (ClCO_{2}H)	0.27
Acetic acid (CH_{3}CO_{2}H)	4.76
Glycinium cation (H_{3}N^{+}CH_{2}CO_{2}H)	2.34
Fluoroacetic acid (FCH_{2}CO_{2}H)	2.586
Difluoroacetic acid (F_{2}CHCO_{2}H)	1.33
Trifluoroacetic acid (CF_{3}CO_{2}H)	0.23
Chloroacetic acid (ClCH_{2}CO_{2}H)	2.86
Dichloroacetic acid (Cl_{2}CHCO_{2}H)	1.29
Trichloroacetic acid (CCl_{3}CO_{2}H)	0.65
Benzoic acid (C_{6}H_{5}−CO_{2}H)	4.2
2-Nitrobenzoic acid (ortho-C_{6}H_{4}(NO_{2})CO_{2}H)	2.16
Oxalic acid (HO−C(=O)−C(=O)−OH) (first dissociation)	1.27
Hydrogen oxalate (HO−C(=O)−CO^{−}_{2}) (second dissociation of oxalic acid)	4.14

Deprotonation of carboxylic acids gives carboxylate anions; these are resonance stabilized, because the negative charge is delocalized over the two oxygen atoms, increasing the stability of the anion. Each of the carbon–oxygen bonds in the carboxylate anion has a partial double-bond character. The carbonyl carbon's partial positive charge is also weakened by the −^{1}/_{2} negative charges on the 2 oxygen atoms.

=== Odour ===
Carboxylic acids often have strong sour odours. Esters of carboxylic acids tend to have fruity, pleasant odours, and many are used in perfume.

=== Characterization ===
Carboxylic acids are readily identified as such by infrared spectroscopy. They exhibit a sharp band associated with vibration of the C=O carbonyl bond (ν_{C=O}) between 1680 and 1725 cm^{−1}. A characteristic ν_{O–H} band appears as a broad peak in the 2500 to 3000 cm^{−1} region. By ^{1}H NMR spectrometry, the hydroxyl hydrogen appears in the 10–13 ppm region, although it is often either broadened or not observed owing to exchange with traces of water.

== Occurrence and applications ==
Many carboxylic acids are produced industrially on a large scale. They are also frequently found in nature. Esters of fatty acids are the main components of lipids and polyamides of aminocarboxylic acids are the main components of proteins.

Carboxylic acids are used in the production of polymers, pharmaceuticals, solvents, and food additives. Industrially important carboxylic acids include acetic acid (component of vinegar, precursor to solvents and coatings), acrylic and methacrylic acids (precursors to polymers, adhesives), adipic acid (polymers), citric acid (a flavor and preservative in food and beverages), ethylenediaminetetraacetic acid (chelating agent), fatty acids (coatings), maleic acid (polymers), propionic acid (food preservative), terephthalic acid (polymers). Important carboxylate salts are soaps.

== Synthesis ==
=== Biological routes ===
Two main reactions of RuBisCo: CO_{2} fixation and oxygenation.

Ribulose-1,5-bisphosphate carboxylase/oxygenase (aka RuBisCo), the most abundant protein, catalyzes the carbonation to give carboxylic acids. This conversion is the carbon-fixation step in photosynthesis. Routes to other biologically prevalent carboxylic acids - citric, oxalic, amino acids, etc. - entail hydrolysis of thioesters and phosphate esters.

=== Industrial routes ===
In contrast to methods used on a laboratory scale, industrial routes to carboxylic acids often require specialized equipment for high pressures and high temperatures.

- Carbonylation of alcohols as illustrated by the Cativa process for the production of acetic acid. Formic acid is prepared by a different carbonylation pathway, also starting from methanol.
- Oxidation of aldehydes with air using cobalt and manganese catalysts. The required aldehydes can be obtained from alkenes by hydroformylation.
- Oxidation of hydrocarbons using air. For simple alkanes, this method is inexpensive but not selective enough to be useful. Allylic and benzylic compounds undergo more selective oxidations. Alkyl groups on a benzene ring are oxidized to the carboxylic acid, regardless of its chain length. Benzoic acid from toluene, terephthalic acid from para-xylene, and phthalic acid from ortho-xylene are illustrative large-scale conversions. Acrylic acid is generated from propene.
- Hydrocarboxylation of alkenes. This method is effective for alkenes that generate secondary and tertiary carbocations, e.g. isobutylene to pivalic acid. In the Koch reaction, the addition of water and carbon monoxide to alkenes or alkynes is catalyzed by strong acids. Hydrocarboxylations involve the simultaneous addition of water and CO. Such reactions are sometimes called "Reppe chemistry."

HC≡CH + CO + H_{2}O → CH_{2}=CH−CO_{2}H

- Hydrolysis of esters. Triglycerides, obtained from plant or animal oils, are precursors to long-chain carboxylic acids are related to soap making.
- Fermentation of ethanol. This method is used in the production of vinegar.
- Carbonation, such as the Kolbe–Schmitt reaction as a route to salicylic acid, precursor to aspirin.

=== Laboratory methods ===
Preparative methods for small scale reactions for research or for production of fine chemicals often employ expensive consumable reagents.

- Oxidation of primary alcohols or aldehydes with strong oxidants such as potassium dichromate, Jones reagent, potassium permanganate, or sodium chlorite. The method is more suitable for laboratory conditions than the industrial use of air, which is "greener" because it yields less inorganic side products such as chromium or manganese oxides.
- Oxidative cleavage of olefins by ozonolysis, potassium permanganate, or potassium dichromate.
- Hydrolysis of nitriles, esters, or amides, usually with acid- or base-catalysis.
- Carbonation of a Grignard reagent and organolithium reagents:

RLi + CO_{2} → RCO^{−}_{2}Li^{+}
RCO^{−}_{2}Li^{+} + HCl → RCO_{2}H + LiCl

- Halogenation followed by hydrolysis of methyl ketones in the haloform reaction
- Base-catalyzed cleavage of non-enolizable ketones, especially aryl ketones:

R−C(=O)−Ar + H_{2}O → R−CO_{2}H + ArH

Routes to carboxylic acids.

=== Less-common reactions ===
Many reactions produce carboxylic acids but are used only in specific cases or are mainly of academic interest.

- Disproportionation of an aldehyde in the Cannizzaro reaction
- Rearrangement of diketones in the benzilic acid rearrangement
- Involving the generation of benzoic acids are the von Richter reaction from nitrobenzenes and the Kolbe–Schmitt reaction from phenols.

== Reactions ==
Carboxylic acid organic reactions

=== Acid-base reactions ===
Carboxylic acids react with bases to form carboxylate salts, in which the hydrogen of the hydroxyl (–OH) group is replaced with a metal cation. For example, acetic acid found in vinegar reacts with sodium bicarbonate (baking soda) to form sodium acetate, carbon dioxide, and water:

CH_{3}COOH + NaHCO_{3} → CH_{3}COO^{−}Na^{+} + CO_{2} + H_{2}O

=== Conversion to esters, amides, anhydrides ===
Widely practiced reactions convert carboxylic acids into esters, amides, carboxylate salts, acid chlorides, acid anhydrides, and alcohols. Their conversion to esters is widely used, e.g. in the production of polyesters. Likewise, carboxylic acids are converted into amides, but this conversion typically does not occur by direct reaction of the carboxylic acid and the amine. Instead esters are typical precursors to amides. The conversion of amino acids into peptides is a significant biochemical process that requires ATP.

Converting a carboxylic acid to an amide is possible, but not straightforward. Instead of acting as a nucleophile, an amine will react as a base in the presence of a carboxylic acid to give the ammonium carboxylate salt. Heating the salt to above 100 °C will drive off water and lead to the formation of the amide. This method of synthesizing amides is industrially important, and has laboratory applications as well.

In the presence of a strong acid catalyst, carboxylic acids can condense to form acid anhydrides. The condensation produces water, however, which can hydrolyze the anhydride back to the starting carboxylic acids. Thus, the formation of the anhydride via condensation is an equilibrium process.

Under acid-catalyzed conditions, carboxylic acids will react with alcohols to form esters via the Fischer esterification reaction, which is also an equilibrium process. Alternatively, diazomethane can be used to convert an acid to an ester. While esterification reactions with diazomethane often give quantitative yields, diazomethane is only useful for forming methyl esters.

=== Reduction ===
Like esters, most carboxylic acids can be reduced to alcohols by hydrogenation, or using hydride transferring agents such as lithium aluminium hydride. Strong alkyl transferring agents, such as organolithium compounds but not Grignard reagents, will reduce carboxylic acids to ketones along with transfer of the alkyl group.

The Vilsmaier reagent (N,N-Dimethyl(chloromethylene)ammonium chloride; [ClHC=N^{+}(CH_{3})_{2}]Cl^{−}) is a highly chemoselective agent for carboxylic acid reduction. It selectively activates the carboxylic acid to give the carboxymethyleneammonium salt, which can be reduced by a mild reductant like lithium tris(t-butoxy)aluminum hydride to afford an aldehyde in a one pot procedure. This procedure is known to tolerate reactive carbonyl functionalities such as ketone as well as moderately reactive ester, olefin, nitrile, and halide moieties.

=== Conversion to acyl halides ===
The hydroxyl group on carboxylic acids may be replaced with a chlorine atom using thionyl chloride to give acyl chlorides. In nature, carboxylic acids are converted to thioesters. Thionyl chloride can be used to convert carboxylic acids to their corresponding acyl chlorides. First, carboxylic acid 1 attacks thionyl chloride, and chloride ion leaves. The resulting oxonium ion 2 is activated towards nucleophilic attack and has a good leaving group, setting it apart from a normal carboxylic acid. In the next step, 2 is attacked by chloride ion to give tetrahedral intermediate 3, a chlorosulfite. The tetrahedral intermediate collapses with the loss of sulfur dioxide and chloride ion, giving protonated acyl chloride 4. Chloride ion can remove the proton on the carbonyl group, giving the acyl chloride 5 with a loss of HCl.

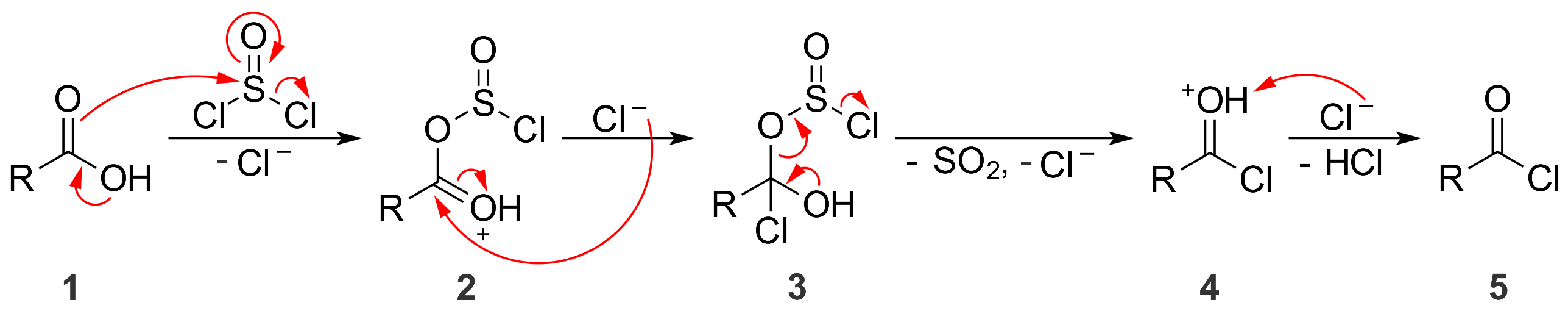

Phosphorus(III) chloride (PCl_{3}) and phosphorus(V) chloride (PCl_{5}) will also convert carboxylic acids to acid chlorides, by a similar mechanism. One equivalent of PCl_{3} can react with three equivalents of acid, producing one equivalent of H_{3}PO_{3}, or phosphorus acid, in addition to the desired acid chloride. PCl_{5} reacts with carboxylic acids in a 1:1 ratio, and produces phosphorus(V) oxychloride (POCl_{3}) and hydrogen chloride (HCl) as byproducts.

=== Reactions with carbanion equivalents ===
Carboxylic acids react with Grignard reagents and organolithiums to form ketones. The first equivalent of nucleophile acts as a base and deprotonates the acid. A second equivalent will attack the carbonyl group to create a geminal alkoxide dianion, which is protonated upon workup to give the hydrate of a ketone. Because most ketone hydrates are unstable relative to their corresponding ketones, the equilibrium between the two is shifted heavily in favor of the ketone. For example, the equilibrium constant for the formation of acetone hydrate from acetone is only 0.002. The carboxylic group is the most acidic in organic compounds.

=== Specialized reactions ===
- As with all carbonyl compounds, the protons on the α-carbon are labile due to keto–enol tautomerization. Thus, the α-carbon is easily halogenated in the Hell–Volhard–Zelinsky halogenation.
- The Schmidt reaction converts carboxylic acids to amines.
- Carboxylic acids are decarboxylated in the Hunsdiecker reaction.
- The Dakin–West reaction converts an amino acid to the corresponding amino ketone.
- In the Barbier–Wieland degradation, a carboxylic acid on an aliphatic chain having a simple methylene bridge at the alpha position can have the chain shortened by one carbon. The inverse procedure is the Arndt–Eistert synthesis, where an acid is converted into acyl halide, which is then reacted with diazomethane to give one additional methylene in the aliphatic chain.
- Many acids undergo oxidative decarboxylation. Enzymes that catalyze these reactions are known as carboxylases (EC 6.4.1) and decarboxylases (EC 4.1.1).
- Carboxylic acids are reduced to aldehydes via the ester and DIBAL, via the acid chloride in the Rosenmund reduction and via the thioester in the Fukuyama reduction.
- In ketonic decarboxylation carboxylic acids are converted to ketones.
- Organolithium reagents (>2 equiv) react with carboxylic acids to give a dilithium 1,1-diolate, a stable tetrahedral intermediate which decomposes to give a ketone upon acidic workup.
- The Kolbe electrolysis is an electrolytic, decarboxylative dimerization reaction. It gets rid of the carboxyl groups of two acid molecules, and joins the remaining fragments together.

== Carboxyl radical ==
The carboxyl radical, •COOH, only exists briefly. The acid dissociation constant of •COOH has been measured using electron paramagnetic resonance spectroscopy. The carboxyl group tends to dimerise to form oxalic acid.

== See also ==
- List of carboxylic acids
- Pseudoacid
- Thiocarboxylic acid
