= Very long chain fatty acid =

Fatty acid with 22 or more carbons

In the field of biology, very-long-chain fatty acid (VLCFA) is a fatty acid with 22 or more carbons. In chemistry, these are more commonly knowns as wax acids, a subgroup of saturated unbranched alkanoic acids. The frontier between fatty acids (strictly defined) and wax acids is fluid.

== Biological importance ==
Their biosynthesis occurs in the endoplasmic reticulum. VLCFA's can represent up to a few percent of the total fatty acid content of a cell.

Unlike most fatty acids, VLCFAs are too long to be metabolized in the mitochondria, in the endoplasmic reticulum (ER) in plants and must be metabolized in peroxisomes.

Certain peroxisomal disorders, such as adrenoleukodystrophy and Zellweger syndrome, can be associated with an accumulation of VLCFAs. Enzymes that produce VLCFAs are the targets of herbicides including pyroxasulfone.

== Major VLCFAs ==
Some of the more common saturated VLCFAs: lignoceric acid (C24), cerotic acid (C26), montanic acid (C28), melissic acid (C30), lacceroic acid (C32), ghedoic acid (C34), and the odd-chain fatty acid ceroplastic acid (C35). Several monounsaturated VLCFAs are also known: nervonic acid (Δ^{15}-24:1), ximenic acid (Δ^{17}-26:1), and lumequeic acid (Δ^{21}-30:1).

The edge case wax acid is behenic acid (C-22).

== See also ==
- ACADVL
- SLC27A2
- SLC27A5
- Cerotic acid, the fatty acid associated with adrenoleukodystrophy

== Bibliography ==
- Moser, H. W.; Moser, A. B.; Frayer, K. K.; Chen, W.; Schulman, J. D.; O'Neill, B. P.; Kishimoto, Y. (1981). "Adrenoleukodystrophy: Increased plasma content of saturated very long chain fatty acids". Neurology. 31 (10): 1241–9. doi:10.1212/WNL.31.10.1241. ISSN 0028-3878. PMID 7202134.
