= Cerotic acid =

26-Carbon fatty acid

Names
- Preferred IUPAC name Hexacosanoic acid

Identifiers
CAS Number	506-46-7
3D model (JSmol)	Interactive image
Beilstein Reference	1799681
ChEBI	CHEBI:31009
ChEMBL	ChEMBL464787
ChemSpider	10037
ECHA InfoCard	100.007.310
EC Number	208-040-2
Gmelin Reference	374172
KEGG	C21931
PubChem CID	10469
UNII	D42CQN6P36
CompTox Dashboard (EPA)	DTXSID7075050
- InChI: InChI=1S/C26H52O2/c1-2-3-4-5-6-7-8-9-10-11-12-13-14-15-16-17-18-19-20-21-22-23-24-25-26(27)28/h2-25H2,1H3,(H,27,28) Key: XMHIUKTWLZUKEX-UHFFFAOYSA-N; InChI=1/C26H52O2/c1-2-3-4-5-6-7-8-9-10-11-12-13-14-15-16-17-18-19-20-21-22-23-24-25-26(27)28/h2-25H2,1H3,(H,27,28) Key: XMHIUKTWLZUKEX-UHFFFAOYAF
- SMILES: O=C(O)CCCCCCCCCCCCCCCCCCCCCCCCC

Properties
Chemical formula	C_{26}H_{52}O_{2}
Molar mass	396.700 g·mol^{−1}
Appearance	white solid
Density	0.8198 g/cm^{3} (100 °C)
Melting point	87.7 °C (189.9 °F; 360.8 K)
Boiling point	250 °C (482 °F; 523 K)
Solubility in water	negligible
Solubility	Soluble in ethanol, ether, chloroform, CS_{2}, turpentine
Refractive index (n_{D})	1.4301 (100 °C)

Hazards
- GHS labelling
Pictograms	(GHS07: Exclamation mark)
Signal word	Warning
Hazard statements	H315, H319, H335
Precautionary statements	P261, P264, P271, P280, P302+P352, P304+P340, P305+P351+P338, P312, P321, P332+P313, P337+P313, P362, P403+P233, P405, P501
NFPA 704 (fire diamond)	0 0
Flash point	> 110 °C
- Except where otherwise noted, data are given for materials in their standard state (at 25 °C [77 °F], 100 kPa). verify (what is ?) Infobox references

Cerotic acid, or hexacosanoic acid, is a 26-carbon long-chain saturated fatty acid with the chemical formula CH_{3}(CH_{2})_{24}COOH. It is most commonly found in beeswax and carnauba wax. It is a white solid, although impure samples appear yellowish.

The name is derived from the Latin word cerotus, which in turn was derived from the Ancient Greek word κηρός (keros), meaning beeswax or honeycomb.

Cerotic acid is also a type of very long chain fatty acid that is often associated with the disease adrenoleukodystrophy, which involves the excessive accumulation of unmetabolized fatty acid chains, including cerotic acid, in the peroxisome.

== See also ==
- List of saturated fatty acids
- Very long chain fatty acids
