= List of carboxylic acids =

Carboxylic acids are organic acids characterized by a carboxyl (-COOH) functional group. The naming of these compounds is governed by IUPAC nomenclature, which ensures systematic and consistent naming of chemicals. Numerous organic compounds have other common names, often originating in historical source material thereof. The systematic IUPAC name is not always the preferred IUPAC name, for example, lactic acid is a common, and also the preferred, name for what systematic rules call 2-hydroxypropanoic acid.

This list is ordered by the number of carbon atoms in a carboxylic acid.

== C1 ==
| IUPAC name | Common name | Structural formula | Notes |
| methanoic acid | formic acid | HCO_{2}H | |
| carbonic acid | hydroxymethanoic acid | HOCO_{2}H | Despite having an organic-like name, H_{2}CO_{3} is not considered an organic compound. |

== C2 ==
| IUPAC name | Common name | Structural formula |
| ethanoic acid | acetic acid | CH_{3}CO_{2}H |
| glycolic acid | hydroxyacetic acid | HOCH_{2}CO_{2}H |
| glyoxylic acid | oxoacetic acid | OHCCO_{2}H |
| oxalic acid | ethanedioic acid | HO_{2}CCO_{2}H |

== C3 ==
| IUPAC name | Common name | Structural formula |
| propanoic acid | propionic acid ethanecarboxylic acid | CH_{3}CH_{2}CO_{2}H |
| acrylic acid | propenoic acid acroleic acid ethylenecarboxylic acid vinylformic acid | CH_{2}=CHCO_{2}H |
| propiolic acid | propynoic acid propargylic acid acetylene carboxylic acid | CH≡CCO_{2}H |
| lactic acid | 2-hydroxypropanoic acid milk acid | CH_{3}CHOHCO_{2}H |
| 3-hydroxypropionic acid | 3-hydroxypropanoic acid hydracrylic acid | CH_{2}OHCH_{2}CO_{2}H |
| glyceric acid | 2,3-dihydroxypropanoic acid | CH_{2}OHCHOHCO_{2}H |
| pyruvic acid | 2-oxopropanoic acid α-ketopropionic acid acetylformic acid pyroracemic acid | CH_{3}COCO_{2}H |
| 3-oxopropanoic acid | malonic semialdehyde 3-oxopropionic acid | OHCCH_{2}CO_{2}H |
| 2,3-dioxopropanoic acid | mesoxalic semialdehyde dioxopropionic acid | OHCCOCO_{2}H |
| malonic acid | propanedioic acid methanedicarboxylic acid | HO_{2}CCH_{2}CO_{2}H |
| tartronic acid | 2--hydroxypropanedioic acid hydroxymalonic acid | HO_{2}CCHOHCO_{2}H |
| 2,2-dihydroxypropanedioic acid | dihydroxymalonic acid mesoxalic acid monohydrate | HO_{2}CC(OH)_{2}CO_{2}H |
| mesoxalic acid | oxopropanedioic acid ketomalonic acid oxomalonic acid | HO_{2}CCOCO_{2}H |
| glycidic acid | 2-oxiranecarboxylic acid oxirane-2-carboxylic acid | CH_{2}OCHCO_{2}H |

== C4 ==
| IUPAC name | Common name | Structural formula |
| butanoic acid | butyric acid propanecarboxylic acid | CH_{3}(CH_{2})_{2}COOH |
| 2-methylpropanoic acid | isobutyric acid isobutanoic acid | (CH_{3})_{2}CHCOOH |
| (E)-but-2-enoic acid | crotonic acid trans-butenoic acid 3-methylacrylic acid β-methacrylic acid (E)-2-butenoic acid | CH_{3}CH=CHCOOH |
| (Z)-but-2-enoic acid | isocrotonic acid cis-crotonic acid cis-butenoic acid (Z)-2-butenoic acid | CH_{3}CH=CHCOOH |
| 2-methylpropenoic acid | methacrylic acid α-methacrylic acid 2-methylacrylic acid isobutenoic acid | CH_{2}=C(CH_{3})COOH |
| but-3-enoic acid | vinylacetic acid allylic acid 3-butenoic acid β-butenoic acid | CH_{2}=CHCH_{2}COOH |
| but-2-ynoic acid | tetrolic acid 2-butynoic acid | CH_{3}C≡CCOOH |
| 2-hydroxybutanoic acid | 2-hydroxybutyric acid α-hydroxybutyrate | CH_{3}CH_{2}CHOHCOOH |
| 3-hydroxybutanoic acid | β-hydroxybutyric acid 3-hydroxybutyric acid | CH_{3}CHOHCH_{2}COOH |
| 4-hydroxybutanoic acid | γ-hydroxybutyric acid GHB; 4-hydroxybutyric acid | HOCH_{2}(CH_{2})_{2}COOH |
| 2-oxobutanoic acid | α-ketobutyric acid | CH_{3}CH_{2}COCOOH |
| 3-oxobutanoic acid | acetoacetic acid diacetic acid | CH_{3}COCH_{2}COOH |
| 4-oxobutanoic acid | succinic semialdehyde | OHC(CH_{2})_{2}COOH |
| butanedioic acid | succinic acid | HOOC(CH_{2})_{2}COOH |
| 2-methylpropanedioic acid | methylmalonic acid | HOOCCH(CH_{3})COOH |
| (E)-butenedioic acid | fumaric acid trans-1,2-ethylenedicarboxylic acid trans-butenedioic acid allomaleic acid boletic acid donitic acid lichenic acid | HOOCCH=CHCOOH |
| (Z)-butenedioic acid | maleic acid cis-butenedioic acid malenic acid maleinic acid toxilic acid | HOOCCH=CHCOOH |
| butynedioic acid | acetylenedicarboxylic acid 2-butynedioic acid | HOOCC≡CCOOH |
| hydroxybutanedioic acid | malic acid hydroxysuccinic acid 2-hydroxybutanedioic acid | HOOCCH_{2}CHOHCOOH |
| 2,3-dihydroxybutanedioic acid | tartaric acid 2,3-dihydroxysuccinic acid racemic acid threaric acid uvic acid paratartaric acid | HOOC(CHOH)_{2}COOH |
| oxobutanedioic acid | oxaloacetic acid oxalacetic acid oxosuccinic acid ketosuccinic acid | HOOCCH_{2}COCOOH |
| dioxobutanedioic acid | dioxosuccinic acid | HOOC(CO)_{2}COOH |

== C5 ==
| IUPAC name | Common name | Structural formula |
| pentanoic acid | valeric acid valerianic acid butane-1-carboxylic acid | CH_{3}(CH_{2})_{3}COOH |
| 3-methylbutanoic acid | isovaleric acid isopentanoic acid delphinic acid β-methylbutiric acid 3-methylbutiric acid | (CH_{3})_{2}CHCH_{2}COOH |
| 2-methylbutanoic acid | 2-methylbutiric acid | CH_{3}CH_{2}CH(CH_{3})COOH |
| 2,2-dimethylpropanoic acid | pivalic acid trimethylacetic acid neopentanoic acid | (CH_{3})_{3}CCOOH |
| 3-hydroxypentanoic acid | β-hydroxyvaleric acid 3-hydroxyvaleric acid β-hydroxypentanoate | CH_{3}CH_{2}CHOHCH_{2}COOH |
| 4-hydroxypentanoic acid | γ-hydroxyvaleric acid GHV; 4-methyl-GHB | CH_{3}CHOH(CH_{2})_{2}COOH |
| 3-hydroxy-3-methylbutanoic acid | β-hydroxy β-methylbutyric acid HMB β-hydroxyisovaleric acid 3-hydroxyisovaleric acid | (CH_{3})_{2}COHCH_{2}COOH |
| pentanedioic acid | glutaric acid propane-1,3-dicarboxylic acid n-pyrotartaric acid | HOOC(CH_{2})_{3}COOH |
| 2-oxopentanedioic acid | α-ketoglutaric acid 2-ketoglutaric acid 2-oxoglutaric acid oxoglutaric acid | HOOC(CH_{2})_{2}COCOOH |
| 3-oxopentanedioic acid | acetonedicarboxylic acid 3-oxoglutaric acid β-ketoglutaric acid 3-ketoglutaric acid | HOOCCH_{2}COCH_{2}COOH |
| furan-2-carboxylic acid | 2-furoic acid α-furoic acid pyromucic acid 2-carboxyfuran α-furancarboxylic acid | furyl-COOH |
| tetrahydrofuran-2-carboxylic acid | tetrahydro-2-furoic acid tetrahydrofuroic acid tetrahydrofuran-2-carboxylic acid | tetrahydrofuryl-COOH |

== C6 ==
| IUPAC name | Common name | Structural formula |
| hexanoic acid | caproic acid n-caproic acid | CH_{3}(CH_{2})_{4}COOH |
| 4-Methylpentanoic acid | isocaproic acid 4-Methylvaleric acid | CH_{3}CH(CH_{3})CH_{2}CH_{2}COOH |
| hexanedioic acid | adipic acid hexane-1,6-dioic acid | HOOC(CH_{2})_{4}COOH |
| 2,3-dimethylbutanoic acid | | CH_{3}(CHCH_{3})_{2}COOH |
| 3,3-dimethylbutanoic acid | | CH_{3}C(CH_{3})_{2}CH_{2}COOH |
| 2-hydroxypropane-1,2,3-tricarboxylic acid | citric acid 3-carboxy-3-hydroxypentanedioic acid 2-hydroxy-1,2,3-propanetricarboxylic acid | HOC(COOH)((CH_{2})COOH)_{2} |
| prop-1-ene-1,2,3-tricarboxylic acid | aconitic acid achilleic acid equisetic acid citridinic acid pyrocitric acid | HOOCCH=C(COOH)CH_{2}COOH |
| 1-hydroxypropane-1,2,3-tricarboxylic acid | isocitric acid | HOOCCHOHCH(COOH)CH_{2}COOH |
| (2E,4E)-hexa-2,4-dienoic acid | sorbic acid | CH_{3}(CH=CH)_{2}COOH |

== C7 ==
| IUPAC name | Common name | Structural formula |
| heptanoic acid | enanthic acid oenanthic acid n-Heptylic acid n-Heptoic acid | CH_{3}(CH_{2})_{5}COOH |
| heptanedioic acid | pimelic acid | HOOC(CH_{2})_{5}COOH |
| cyclohexanecarboxylic acid | | C_{6}H_{11}COOH |
| benzenecarboxylic acid | benzoic acid carboxybenzene dracylic acid | C_{6}H_{5}COOH |
| 2-hydroxybenzoic acid | salicylic acid | HOC_{6}H_{4}COOH |
| 2,2-dimethylpentanoic acid | 2,2-dimethylvaleric acid | CH_{3}(CH_{2})_{2}C(CH_{3})_{2}COOH |
| 2,3-dimethylpentanoic acid | | C_{2}H_{5}(CHCH_{3})_{2}COOH |
| 2,4-dimethylpentanoic acid | | CH_{3}(CHCH_{3})CH_{2}(CHCH_{3})COOH |
| 3,3-dimethylpentanoic acid | | C_{2}H_{5}C(CH_{3})_{2}CH_{2}COOH |
| 2-ethylpentanoic acid | 2-ethylvaleric acid | C_{3}H_{7}CH(C_{2}H_{5})COOH |
| 3-ethylpentanoic acid | | C_{2}H_{5}CH(C_{2}H_{5})CH_{2}COOH |
| 2-methylhexanoic acid | 2-methylcaproic acid | C_{4}H_{9}CH(CH_{3})COOH |
| 3-methylhexanoic acid | | C_{3}H_{7}CH(CH_{3})CH_{2}COOH |
| 2,2,3-trimethylbutanoic acid | | CH_{3}CH(CH_{3})C(CH_{3})_{2}COOH |
| 2-ethyl-2-methylbutanoic acid | | C_{2}H_{5}C(C_{2}H_{5})(CH_{3})COOH |
| 2-ethyl-3- methylbutanoic acid | | CH_{3}CH(CH_{3})CH(C_{2}H_{5})COOH |

== C8 ==
| IUPAC name | Common name | Structural formula |
| octanoic acid | caprylic acid | CH_{3}(CH_{2})_{6}COOH |
| benzene-1,2-dicarboxylic acid | phthalic acid | C_{6}H_{4}(COOH)_{2} |
| benzene-1,3-dicarboxylic acid | isophthalic acid | C_{6}H_{4}(COOH)_{2} |
| benzene-1,4-dicarboxylic acid | terephthalic acid | C_{6}H_{4}(COOH)_{2} |
| 3-Cyclopentylpropanoic acid | cypionic acid | C_{5}H_{9}(CH_{2})_{2}COOH |
| 2-methylheptanoic acid | 2-methylenanthic acid | C_{5}H_{11}CH(CH_{3})COOH |
| 3-methylheptanoic acid | | C_{4}H_{9}CH(CH_{3})CH_{2}COOH |
| 4-methylheptanoic acid | | C_{3}H_{7}CH(CH_{3})C_{2}H_{4}COOH |
| 5-methylheptanoic acid | | C_{2}H_{5}CH(CH_{3})C_{3}H_{6}COOH |
| 6-methylheptanoic acid | | (CH_{3})_{2}CHC_{4}H_{8}COOH |
| 2,2-dimethylhexanoic acid | | C_{4}H_{9}C(CH_{3})_{2}COOH |
| 2,3-dimethylhexanoic acid | | C_{3}H_{7}[CH(CH_{3})]_{2}COOH |
| 2,4-dimethylhexanoic acid | | C_{2}H_{5}CH(CH_{3})CH_{2}CH(CH_{3})COOH |
| 2,5-dimethylhexanoic acid | | CH_{3}CH(CH_{3})C_{2}H_{4}(CH_{3})COOH |
| 3,3-dimethylhexanoic acid | | C_{3}H_{7}C(CH_{3})_{2}CH_{2}COOH |
| 3,4-dimethylhexanoic acid | | C_{2}H_{5}[CH(CH_{3})]_{2}CH_{2}COOH |
| 3,5-dimethylhexanoic acid | | (CH_{3})_{2}CHCH_{2}CH(CH_{3})CH_{2}COOH |
| 4,4-dimethylhexanoic acid | | C_{2}H_{5}C(CH3)_{2}C_{2}H_{4}COOH |
| 4,5-dimethylhexanoic acid | | CH_{3}[CH(CH)_{3}]_{2}C_{2}H_{4}COOH |
| 5,5-dimethylhexanoic acid | | (CH_{3})_{3}CC_{3}H_{6}COOH |
| 2-ethylhexanoic acid | octoic acid | C_{4}H_{9}CH(C_{2}H_{5})COOH |
| 3-ethylhexanoic acid | | C_{3}H_{7}CH(C_{2}H_{5})CH_{2}COOH |
| 4-ethylhexanoic acid | | C_{2}H_{5}CH(C_{2}H_{5})C_{2}H_{4}COOH |
| 2-octenoic acid | | C_{5}H_{11}CH=CHCOOH |
| 3-octenoic acid | | C_{4}H_{9}CH=CHCH_{2}COOH |
| 4-octenoic acid | | C_{3}H_{7}CH=CHC_{2}H_{4}COOH |
| 5-octenoic acid | | C_{2}H_{5}CH=CHC_{3}H_{6}COOH |
| 6-octenoic acid | | CH_{3}CH=CHC_{4}H_{8}COOH |
| 7-octenoic acid | | CH_{2}=CHC_{5}H_{10}COOH |

== C9 ==
| IUPAC name | Common name | Structural formula |
| nonanoic acid | pelargonic acid 1-octanecarboxylic acid | CH_{3}(CH_{2})_{7}COOH |
| benzene-1,3,5-tricarboxylic acid | trimesic acid | C_{6}H_{3}(COOH)_{3} |
| (E)-3-phenylprop-2-enoic acid | cinnamic acid trans-cinnamic acid phenylacrylic acid cinnamylic acid 3-phenylacrylic acid (E)-cinnamic acid benzenepropenoic acid isocinnamic acid | C_{6}H_{5}CH=CHCOOH |

== C10 ==
| IUPAC name | Common name | Structural formula |
| decanoic acid | capric acid | CH_{3}(CH_{2})_{8}COOH |
| decanedioic acid | sebacic acid 1,8-octanedicarboxylic acid | HOOC(CH_{2})_{8}COOH |

== C11 ==
| IUPAC name | Common name | Structural formula |
| undecanoic acid | hendecanoic acid undecylic acid | CH_{3}(CH_{2})_{9}COOH |

== C12 ==
| IUPAC name | Common name | Structural formula |
| dodecanoic acid | lauric acid dodecylic acid dodecoic acid laurostearic acid fulvic acid 1-undecanecarboxylic acid duodecylic acid | CH_{3}(CH_{2})_{10}COOH |
| benzene-1,2,3,4,5,6-hexacarboxylic acid | mellitic acid graphitic acid benzenehexacarboxylic acid | C_{6}(COOH)_{6} |

== C13 ==
| IUPAC name | Common name | Structural formula |
| tridecanoic acid | tridecylic acid | CH_{3}(CH_{2})_{11}COOH |

== C14 ==
| IUPAC name | Common name | Structural formula |
| tetradecanoic acid | myristic acid | CH_{3}(CH_{2})_{12}COOH |

== C15 ==
| IUPAC name | Common name | Structural formula |
| pentadecanoic acid | pentadecylic acid | CH_{3}(CH_{2})_{13}COOH |
| 13-methyltetradecanoic acid | 13-methylmyristic acid | (CH_{3})_{2}CH(CH_{2})_{11}COOH |

== C16 ==
| IUPAC name | Common name | Structural formula |
| hexadecanoic acid | palmitic acid | CH_{3}(CH_{2})_{14}COOH |

== C17 ==
| IUPAC name | Common name | Structural formula |
| heptadecanoic acid | margaric acid heptadecylic acid | CH_{3}(CH_{2})_{15}COOH |

== C18 ==
| IUPAC name | Common name | Structural formula |
| (9Z,12R,15Z)-12-hydroxyoctadeca-9,15-dienoic acid | densipolic acid | C_{18}H_{32}O_{3} |
| octadecanoic acid | stearic acid | CH_{3}(CH_{2})_{16}COOH |
| (9Z)-octadec-9-enoic acid | oleic acid (9Z)-octadecenoic acid (Z)-octadec-9-enoic acid cis-9-octadecenoic acid cis-Δ^{9}-octadecenoic acid | CH_{3}(CH_{2})_{7}CH=CH(CH_{2})_{7}COOH |
| (9Z,12Z)-octadeca-9,12-dienoic acid | linoleic acid | CH_{3}(CH_{2})_{4}CH=CHCH_{2}CH=CH(CH_{2})_{7}COOH |
| (9Z,12Z,15Z)-octadeca-9,12,15-trienoic acid | ALA α-linolenic acid cis, cis,cis-9,12,15-octadecatrienoic acid (Z,Z,Z)-9,12,15-octadecatrienoic acid | CH_{3}CH_{2}CH=CHCH_{2}CH=CHCH_{2}CH=CH(CH_{2})_{7}COOH |
| (6Z,9Z,12Z)-octadeca-6,9,12-trienoic acid | GLA γ-linolenic acid gamolenic acid | CH_{3}(CH_{2})_{4}CH=CHCH_{2}CH=CHCH_{2}CH=CH(CH_{2})_{4}COOH |
| (6Z,9Z,12Z,15Z)-octadeca-6,9,12,15-tetraenoic acid | SDA stearidonic acid moroctic acid | CH_{3}CH_{2}CH=CHCH_{2}CH=CHCH_{2}CH=CHCH_{2}CH=CH(CH_{2})_{5}COOH |

== C19 ==
| IUPAC name | Common name | Structural formula |
| nonadecanoic acid | nonadecylic acid | CH_{3}(CH_{2})_{17}COOH |
| 10-Methyloctadecanoic acid | Tuberculostearic acid | CH_{3}(CH_{2})_{7}CH(CH_{3})(CH_{2})_{8}COOH |
| 2,6,10,14-Tetramethylpentadecanoic acid | Pristanic acid | (CH_{3})_{2}CH(CH_{2})_{3}CH(CH_{3})(CH_{2})_{3}CH(CH_{3})(CH_{2})_{3}CH(CH_{3})COOH |

== C20 ==
| IUPAC name | Common name | Structural formula |
| icosanoic acid | arachidic acid arachic acid | CH_{3}(CH_{2})_{18}COOH |
| (5Z,8Z,11Z)-eicosa-5,8,11-trienoic acid | Mead's acid | CH_{3}(CH_{2})_{7}CH=CHCH_{2}CH=CHCH_{2}CH=CH(CH_{2})_{3}COOH |
| (5Z,8Z,11Z,14Z)-eicosa-5,8,11,14-tetraenoic acid | AA; ARA arachidonic acid | CH_{3}(CH_{2})_{4}CH=CHCH_{2}CH=CHCH_{2}CH=CHCH_{2}CH=CH(CH_{2})_{3}COOH |
| (5Z,8Z,11Z,14Z,17Z)-eicosa-5,8,11,14-pentaenoic acid | EPA | CH_{3}CH_{2}CH=CHCH_{2}CH=CHCH_{2}CH=CHCH_{2}CH=CHCH_{2}CH=CH(CH_{2})_{3}COOH |
| (7R,11R)-3,7,11,15-Tetramethylhexadecanoic acid | Phytanic acid | (CH_{3})_{2}CH(CH_{2})_{3}CH(CH_{3})(CH_{2})_{3}CH(CH_{3})(CH_{2})_{3}CH(CH_{3})CH_{2}COOH |

== C21 ==
| IUPAC name | Common name | Structural formula |
| heneicosanoic acid | | CH_{3}(CH_{2})_{19}COOH |

== C22 ==
| IUPAC name | Common name | Structural formula |
| docosanoic acid | behenic acid | CH_{3}(CH_{2})_{20}COOH |
| (4Z,7Z,10Z,13Z,16Z,19Z)-docosa-4,7,10,13,16,19-hexaenoic acid | DHA cervonic acid | CH_{3}CH_{2}CH=CHCH_{2}CH=CHCH_{2}CH=CHCH_{2}CH=CHCH_{2}CH=CHCH_{2}CH=CH(CH_{2})_{2}COOH |

== C23 ==
| IUPAC name | Common name | Structural formula |
| tricosanoic acid | tricosylic acid | CH_{3}(CH_{2})_{21}COOH |

== C24 ==
| IUPAC name | Common name | Structural formula |
| tetracosanoic acid | lignoceric acid | CH_{3}(CH_{2})_{22}COOH |

== C25 ==
| IUPAC name | Common name | Structural formula |
| pentacosanoic acid | pentacosylic acid | CH_{3}(CH_{2})_{23}COOH |

== C26 ==
| IUPAC name | Common name | Structural formula |
| hexacosanoic acid | cerotic acid | CH_{3}(CH_{2})_{24}COOH |
