= 1-Pentadecanol =

15-carbon alcohol

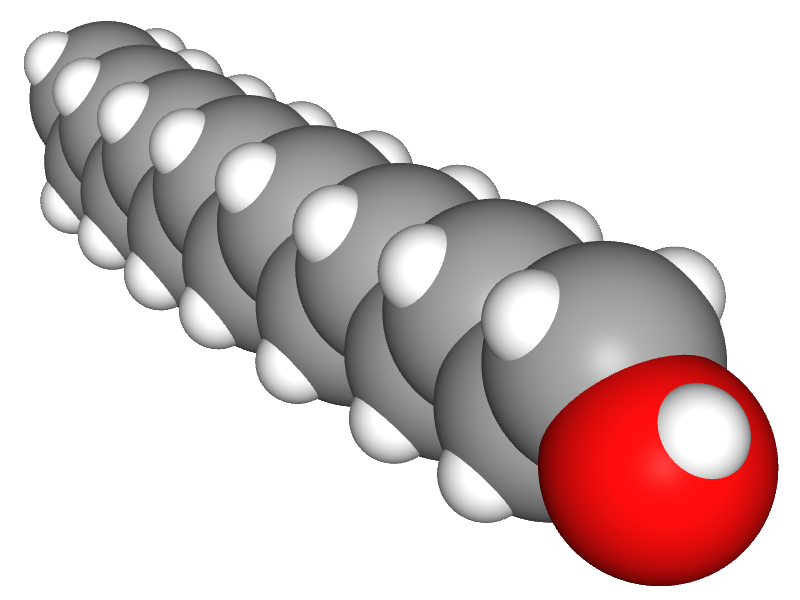

Names
- Preferred IUPAC name Pentadecan-1-ol
- Other names Pentadecyl alcohol, n-pentadecanol

Identifiers
CAS Number	629-76-5
3D model (JSmol)	Interactive image
ChEBI	CHEBI:77468
ChEMBL	ChEMBL26561
ChemSpider	11891
ECHA InfoCard	100.010.099
EC Number	211-107-9
PubChem CID	12397
UNII	333QVA4G2Q
CompTox Dashboard (EPA)	DTXSID0027270
- InChI: InChI=1S/C15H32O/c1-2-3-4-5-6-7-8-9-10-11-12-13-14-15-16/h16H,2-15H2,1H3 Key: REIUXOLGHVXAEO-UHFFFAOYSA-N
- SMILES: CCCCCCCCCCCCCCCO

Properties
Chemical formula	C_{15}H_{32}O
Molar mass	228.420 g·mol^{−1}
Appearance	White solid
Density	0.842 kg/L at 40 °C
Melting point	41–44 °C (106–111 °F; 314–317 K)
Boiling point	269–271 °C (516–520 °F; 542–544 K)

Hazards
- GHS labelling
Pictograms	(GHS07: Exclamation mark) (GHS09: Environmental hazard)
Signal word	Warning
Hazard statements	H315, H319, H410, H411
Precautionary statements	P264, P273, P280, P302+P352, P305+P351+P338, P321, P332+P313, P337+P313, P362, P391, P501
Flash point	112 °C (234 °F; 385 K) closed cup
- Safety data sheet (SDS)
- Except where otherwise noted, data are given for materials in their standard state (at 25 °C [77 °F], 100 kPa). Infobox references

1-Pentadecanol is an organic chemical compound classified as an alcohol. At room temperature, it is a white, flaky solid. It is a saturated long-chain fatty alcohol consisting of a pentadecane chain with a hydroxy group as substituent on one end. It is an achiral molecule (meaning that it has no mirror-image isomers).

Like other long-chain primary alcohols, it is used as an ingredient in industrial chemicals, lubricating oils, and consumer products such as lotions and creams. Additionally, it can be used as a feedstock for processes that use ethoxylation (adding ethylene oxide) and sulfation (adding a sulfo group) reactions to produce surfactants (primarily detergents).

== Properties ==
1-Pentadecanol is generally a stable compound. Like other long-chain primary alcohols, 1-pentadecanol exhibits low oral, skin and respiratory toxicity. However, it may be slightly to moderately irritating to the eyes and skin, and prolonged contact with undiluted alcohols can lead to defatting of the skin. Accordingly, Royal Dutch Shell recommends that eye protection, chemical-resistant gloves, and other protective clothing be worn when handling large amounts of 1-pentadecanol. It floats on water, and can catch fire under certain conditions; in the case of a fire, carbon dioxide, foam, sand, earth, or dry chemical type fire extinguishers are recommended.

In their product literature, Shell claims that high-chain primary alcohols (in the C_{9}–C_{17} range) are "readily biodegradable and unlikely to bioaccumulate". They are not corrosive to carbon steel storage containers or process equipment, and are compatible with a variety of polymers; Shell recommends tetrafluoroethylene, high-density polyethylene, polypropylene and butyl rubber as gasketing materials. Ethylene propene-diene monomer (EPDM) rubber, however, cannot be used.

Compared to other 1-alkanols (1-nonanol, 1-undecanol, and 1-tridecanol), 1-pentadecanol possesses lower solubility in supercritical carbon dioxide. This is consistent with a general trend of decreased solubility in alcohols with longer chains.

When cooling from a liquid state, 1-pentadecanol (at 316.3 K, at standard pressure) assumes a crystalline structure known as the α-form, a "rotator phase" in which molecules can rotate about their long axes. While other long-chain alcohols, cooling further from the α-form, experience a solid-state transition into either a γ-form (with chains tilted to the basal plane normal) or a β-form (with vertical chains), 1-pentadecanol has been observed to exclusively assume the β-form when cooling, which it does at 311.5 K. Differential thermal analysis measurements on 1-pentadecanol were performed at temperatures from 300 to 370 K and pressures of up to 250 MPa; on heating, it was observed to change from a crystalline phase (β-form) to a rotator phase (α-form) a few degrees below its melting point. The observation of this rotator state in pentadecanol was substantiated by dielectric measurements that confirmed its orientational disorder. No triple point exists for 1-pentadecanol.

== Synthesis ==
The alcohol was discovered in 1893 by Angelo Simonini, a student of Adolf Lieben at the University of Vienna, who used a variation of what's known as Hunsdiecker reaction (often called Simonini reaction) to get pentadecyl palmitate from silver palmitate and iodine at 100°C:

2 C_{15}H_{31}COOAg + I_{2} → C_{15}H_{31}COOC_{15}H_{31} + CO_{2} + 2 AgI

=== Industrial production ===
The Shell corporation uses a proprietary process for the synthesis of 1-pentadecanol (referring to it by the trade name Neodol 5) via hydroformylation of olefins produced from ethylene.

=== Natural occurrence ===
Small amounts of 1-pentadecanol have been found (using thin-layer chromatography and GC/MS) to naturally occur in the leaves of Solena amplexicaulis (creeping cucumber). In 2008, a synthesis of pachastrissamine (a cytotoxic lipid compound found in sea sponges) was described starting from 1-pentadecanol.

Fungal oxidization and assimilation of pentadecane has been observed by two citric acid-producing Candida strains (wild type KSH 21 and mutant 337), transforming it into both pentadecanol and pentadecanoic acid through oxidization at one of the terminal carbon atoms. The highest conversion to pentadecanol seen in the 1977 study was from a 3-day fermenter culture of the 337 strain, in which 85.5 mg was developed per 10 g of pentadecane. Some conversion to 2-pentadecanol and 2-pentadecanone was also observed.

== Applications ==
In a 1981 paper, the activities of various primary alcohols were evaluated as substrates for alkyl DHAP synthase's catalysis of fatty alcohol with acyl dihydroxyacetone phosphate in Erlich ascites tumor cells. The specificity of the cells' microsomal alkyl DHAP synthase with respect to different alcohols was investigated; pentadecanol had an activity of approximately 0.2 mol/min/mg protein.

A 1994 study evaluated 1-pentadecanol as a potential anti-acne agent. While primary alcohols were known to be effective against Gram-positive bacteria, it was previously found that free fatty acids and alcohols between C_{8} and C_{14} were skin irritants. Since the effect had ended at C_{15}, several longer-chain alcohols were evaluated for their activity against Propionibacterium acnes; 1-pentadecanol was found to have a minimum inhibitory concentration (MIC) of 0.78 μg/mL and a minimum bactericidal concentration of 1.56 μg/mL.

In a 1995 paper by the same research group, the 0.78 μg/mL MIC against P. acnes was replicated, and remained the lowest MIC against P. acnes among all primary alcohols tested (from C_{6} to C_{20}). 1-Pentadecanol was, additionally, found to have a MIC of 6.25 μg/mL against Brevibacterium ammoniagenes, and a MIC greater than 800 μg/mL (essentially, no effect) against the dermatomycotic yeast Pityrosporum ovale. It, along with 1-hexadecanol, was found to be selectively antimicrobial against P. acnes and not other Gram-positive bacteria (unlike other alcohols, like 1-dodecanol, that were more broadly antimicrobial to all Gram-positive bacteria).

A 2018 computational chemistry study investigated possible uses of alcohol compounds as mycobactericidal disinfectants for the control of Mycobacterium tuberculosis. The study computationally evaluated Gibbs free energy (∆G) for the molecular docking of alcohols C_{1} (methanol) to C_{15} (pentadecanol) as ligands of the InhA, MabA, and PanK receptors. The observed trend was that binding energy between ligand and receptor increased with chain length; pentadecanol, the longest alcohol tested, had a ∆G computationally estimated as −4.9 kcal/mol with InhA, −4.9 kcal/mol with MabA, and −5.5 kcal/mol with PanK. This was compared with triclosan (whose ∆G for those bindings is −6.4 kcal/mol, −6.7 kcal/mol and −7.0 kcal/mol respectively); pentadecanol was found to have "potency" as a mycobactericidal agent and suggested as a "reference" for further development of receptor-targeted mycobactericidal agents.

The properties of fluorinated 1-pentadecanols have been investigated as potential amphiphilic species for aiding adsorption of the pulmonary surfactant dipalmitoylphosphatidylcholine (DPPC). DPPC, while contributing to film rigidity on the surface of alveoli, has poor adsorption and respreading qualities; highly fluorinated amphiphiles can compatibilize it to other surfaces, but at the cost of bioaccumulation both in the human body and in the environment. Therefore, the interaction of several partially fluorinated 1-pentadecanols with DPPC in a Langmuir monolayer was analyzed in a 2018 paper. The molecules were C_{4}F_{9}(CH_{2})_{11}OH, C_{6}F_{13}(CH_{2})_{9}OH, and C_{8}F_{17}(CH_{2})_{7}OH; as the fluorination degree increased, so did hydrophobicity.
