= Rice bran wax =

Rice Bran wax is the vegetable wax extracted from the bran oil of rice (Oryza sativa).

== Chemical composition ==
The main components of rice bran wax are aliphatic acids (wax acids) and higher alcohol esters. The aliphatic acids consist of palmitic acid (C16), behenic acid (C22), lignoceric acid (C24), and other higher wax acids. The higher alcohol esters consist mainly of ceryl alcohol (C26) and melissyl alcohol (C30). Rice bran wax also contains constituents such as free fatty acids (palmitic acid), squalene and phospholipids.

== Uses ==
Rice bran wax is edible and can serve as a substitute for carnauba wax in most applications due to its relatively high melting point. It is used in paper coatings, textiles, explosives, fruit and vegetable coatings, confectionery, pharmaceuticals, candles, moulded novelties, electric insulation, textile and leather sizing, waterproofing, carbon paper, typewriter ribbons, printing inks, lubricants, crayons, adhesives, chewing gum and cosmetics.

In cosmetics, rice bran wax is used as an emollient, and is the basis material for some exfoliation particles. It has been observed that rice bran wax at concentrations as low as 1 wt% in triglycerides can crystallize to form stable gels.

== Physical properties ==
Melting point = 77–86 °C

Saponification value = 75–120

Iodine number = 11.1–17.6

Free fatty acids = 2.1–7.3%

Phosphorus = 0.01–0.15%

Color: Off-white to moderate orange/brown

Odor: typical fatty, crayola-ish

Rice bran wax bleaches and deodorizes readily

INCI name: Oryza Sativa (Rice) Bran Wax.
