= C13H28O =

The molecular formula C_{13}H_{28}O (molar mass: 200.36 g/mol, exact mass: 200.2140 u) may refer to:

- 2,2,4,4-Tetramethyl-3-t-butyl-pentane-3-ol, or tri-tert-butylcarbinol
- 1-Tridecanol
