= Octyldodecanol =

Names
- IUPAC name 2-Octyldodecan-1-ol
- Other names 2-Octyl-1-dodecanol, 2-Octyldodecanol, Eutanol G, Guerbet C20, Isofol 20, Kalcohl 200G

Identifiers
CAS Number	5333-42-6
3D model (JSmol)	Interactive image
ChEMBL	ChEMBL1572050
ChemSpider	20125
DrugBank	DB14134
ECHA InfoCard	100.023.857
EC Number	226-242-9
KEGG	C20338
PubChem CID	21414
UNII	461N1O614Y
CompTox Dashboard (EPA)	DTXSID3036288
- InChI: InChI=1S/C20H42O/c1-3-5-7-9-11-12-14-16-18-20(19-21)17-15-13-10-8-6-4-2/h20-21H,3-19H2,1-2H3 Key: LEACJMVNYZDSKR-UHFFFAOYSA-N
- SMILES: CCCCCCCCCCC(CCCCCCCC)CO

Properties
Chemical formula	C_{20}H_{42}O
Molar mass	298.555 g·mol^{−1}
Appearance	yellow oil
Density	0.84
Melting point	1 °C (34 °F; 274 K)
Boiling point	382 °C (720 °F; 655 K)
Refractive index (n_{D})	1.454

Hazards
Flash point	113 °C (235 °F; 386 K)
- Except where otherwise noted, data are given for materials in their standard state (at 25 °C [77 °F], 100 kPa). Infobox references

Octyldodecanol is a branched-chain primary alcohol used as the isomer 2-octyl-1-dodecanol in cosmetics such as lipstick, or as an anti-blooming agent in facepowder. It is a medium spreading emollient, with equilibrium spreading pressure of 17.0 dyne/cm. Octyldodecanol is in the class of Guerbet alcohols, because it has the branch at the β position. Compared to arachidyl alcohol, the linear alcohol of the same molecular weight, it has a lower melting point, yet retains low volatility.

== Production ==
2-Octyldodecanol is produced by the Guerbet condensation of decyl alcohol.

== Reactions ==
When octyldodecanol is melted with an alkali it yields octyldodecanoic acid by a dehydrogenation reaction.
