= C20H42O =

The molecular formula C_{20}H_{42}O (molar mass: 298.547 g/mol, exact mass: 298.3236 u) may refer to:

- Arachidyl alcohol, or 1-icosanol
- Octyldodecanol

The natural substance 1-Eicosanol has been found in Lonicera japonica, Artemisia baldshuanica, and other organisms.
