= C15H32 =

The molecular formula C_{15}H_{32} (molar mass: 212.41 g/mol) may refer to:

- Pentadecane, an alkane hydrocarbon with the chemical formula CH_{3}(CH_{2})_{13}CH_{3}
- 2,6,10-Trimethyldodecane, a saturated alkane
