= Fatty alcohol =

Class of chemical compounds

An example of a fatty alcohol, oleyl alcohol

Fatty alcohols (or long-chain alcohols) are usually high-molecular mass, straight-chain primary alcohols, but can also range from as few as 4–6 carbon atoms to as many as 22–26, derived from natural fats and oils. The precise chain length varies with the source. Some commercially important fatty alcohols are lauryl, stearyl, and oleyl alcohol. They are colourless oily liquids (for smaller carbon numbers) or waxy solids, although impure samples may appear yellow. Fatty alcohols usually have an even number of carbon atoms and a single alcohol group (–OH) attached to the terminal carbon. Some are unsaturated and some are branched. They are widely used in industry. As with fatty acids, they are often referred to generically by the number of carbon atoms in the molecule, such as "a C_{12} alcohol", that is an alcohol having 12 carbon atoms, for example dodecanol.

== Production and occurrence ==
Fatty alcohols became commercially available in the early 1900s. They were originally obtained by reduction of wax esters with sodium by the Bouveault–Blanc reduction process. In the 1930s catalytic hydrogenation was commercialized, which allowed the conversion of fatty acid esters, typically tallow, to alcohols. In the 1940s and 1950s, petrochemicals became an important source of chemicals, and Karl Ziegler had discovered the polymerization of ethylene. These two developments opened the way to synthetic fatty alcohols. As of 2005, about 50% of fatty alcohols used commercially are of natural origin, the remainder being synthetic (petrochemical).

=== From natural sources ===
Most fatty alcohols in nature are found as waxes, which are esters of fatty acids and fatty alcohols. They are produced by bacteria, plants and animals for purposes of buoyancy, as source of metabolic water and energy, biosonar lenses (marine mammals) and for thermal insulation in the form of waxes (in plants and insects). The traditional sources of fatty alcohols have largely been various vegetable oils, which remain a large-scale feedstock. Animal fats (tallow) were of historic importance, particularly whale oil, however they are no longer used on a large scale. Tallows produce a fairly narrow range of alcohols, predominantly C_{16}–C_{18}, while plant sources produce a wider range of alcohols (C_{6}–C_{24}), making them the preferred source. The alcohols are obtained from the triglycerides (fatty acid triesters), which form the bulk of the oil. The process involves the transesterification of the triglycerides to give methyl esters which are then hydrogenated to produce fatty alcohols. Higher alcohols (C_{20}–C_{22}) can be obtained from rapeseed oil or mustard seed oil. Midcut alcohols are obtained from coconut oil (C_{12}–C_{14}) or palm kernel oil (C_{16}–C_{18}).

The human body produces fatty alcohols using the enzymes fatty acyl-CoA reductase 1 and 2. These fatty alcohols are used as components to produce the ether lipids in cell membranes, and the wax esters in sebum.

=== From petrochemical sources ===
Fatty alcohols are also prepared from petrochemical sources. In the Ziegler process, ethylene is oligomerized using triethylaluminium followed by air oxidation. This process affords even-numbered alcohols:

Al(C_{2}H_{5})_{3} + 18 C_{2}H_{4} → Al(C_{14}H_{29})_{3}
Al(C_{14}H_{29})_{3} + 3/2 O_{2} + 3/2 H_{2}O → 3 HOC_{14}H_{29} + 1/2 Al_{2}O_{3}

Alternatively ethylene can be oligomerized to give mixtures of alkenes, which are subjected to hydroformylation, this process affording odd-numbered aldehyde, which is subsequently hydrogenated. For example, from 1-decene, hydroformylation gives the C_{11} alcohol:

C_{8}H_{17}CH=CH_{2} + H_{2} + CO → C_{8}H_{17}CH_{2}CH_{2}CHO
C_{8}H_{17}CH_{2}CH_{2}CHO + H_{2} → C_{8}H_{17}CH_{2}CH_{2}CH_{2}OH

In the Shell higher olefin process, the chain-length distribution in the initial mixture of alkene oligomers is adjusted so as to more closely match market demand. Shell does this by means of an intermediate metathesis reaction. The resultant mixture is fractionated and hydroformylated/hydrogenated in a subsequent step.

== Applications ==
Fatty alcohols are mainly used in the production of detergents and surfactants. Being viscous and immiscible with water, they find use as co-emulsifiers, emollients, and thickeners in cosmetics and food industry.

Fatty alcohol are converted to their ethoxylates by treatment with ethylene oxide:

RCH_{2}OH + n C_{2}H_{4}O → RCH_{2}(OCH_{2}CH_{2})_{n}OH

The resulting fatty alcohol ethoxylates are important surfactants. They are named after the parent fatty alcohol (such as lauryl alcohol and stearyl alcohol) with an "eth" suffix, i.e., laureth and steareth. These terms are followed by an index for the average number of ethoxylate groups; for example, laureth-20 denotes an ethoxylated lauryl alcohol with about 20 ethoxy units on average and has the formula CH_{3}(CH_{2})_{10}CH_{2}(OCH_{2}CH_{2})_{20}OH.

Fatty alcohols are precursors to another large class of surfactants, the sodium alkyl sulfates such as sodium dodecyl sulfate (SDS). Five million tons of SDS and related materials are produced annually by sulfation of dodecyl alcohol and related fatty alcohols.

== Nutrition ==
The metabolism of fatty alcohols is impaired in several inherited human peroxisomal disorders, including adrenoleukodystrophy and Sjögren–Larsson syndrome.

== Safety ==
=== Human health ===
Fatty alcohols are relatively benign materials, with LD_{50} (oral, rat) ranging from 3.1–4 g/kg for hexanol to 6–8 g/kg for octadecanol. For a 50 kg person, these values translate to more than 100 g. Tests of acute and repeated exposures have revealed a low level of toxicity from inhalation, oral or dermal exposure of fatty alcohols. Fatty alcohols are not very volatile and the acute lethal concentration is greater than the saturated vapor pressure. Longer-chain (C_{12}–C_{16}) fatty alcohols produce fewer health effects than short-chain (smaller than C_{12}). Short-chain fatty alcohols are considered eye irritants, while long chain alcohols are not. Fatty alcohols exhibit no skin sensitization.

Repeated exposure to fatty alcohols produce low-level toxicity and certain compounds in this category can cause local irritation on contact or low-grade liver effects (essentially linear alcohols have a slightly higher rate of occurrence of these effects). No effects on the central nervous system have been seen with inhalation and oral exposure. Tests of repeated bolus dosages of 1-hexanol and 1-octanol showed potential for CNS depression and induced respiratory distress. No potential for peripheral neuropathy has been found. In rats, the no observed adverse effect level (NOAEL) ranges from 200 mg/kg/day to 1000 mg/kg/day by ingestion. There has been no evidence that fatty alcohols are mutagenic or cause reproductive toxicity or infertility. Fatty alcohols are effectively eliminated from the body when exposed, limiting possibility of retention or bioaccumulation.

Margins of exposure resulting from consumer uses of these chemicals are adequate for the protection of human health as determined by the Organisation for Economic Co-operation and Development (OECD) high production volume chemicals program.

=== Environment ===
Fatty alcohols up to chain length C_{18} are biodegradable, with length up to C_{16} biodegrading within 10 days completely. Chains C_{16} to C_{18} were found to biodegrade in rates ranging from 62% to 76% in 10 days. Chains greater than C_{18} were found to degrade by 37% in 10 days. Field studies at wastewater treatment plants have shown that 99% of fatty alcohols of lengths C_{12}–C_{18} are removed.

Fate prediction using fugacity modeling has shown that fatty alcohols with chain lengths of C_{10} and greater in water partition into sediment. Lengths C_{14} and above are predicted to stay in the air upon release. Modeling shows that each type of fatty alcohol will respond independently upon environmental release.

=== Aquatic organisms ===
Fish, invertebrates and algae experience similar levels of toxicity with fatty alcohols although it is dependent on chain length with the shorter chain having greater toxicity potential. Longer chain lengths show no toxicity to aquatic organisms.

Chain size	Acute toxicity for fish	Chronic toxicity for fish
<C_{11}	1–100 mg/L	0.1–1.0 mg/L
C_{11}–C_{13}	0.1–1.0 mg/L	0.1–<1.0 mg/L
C_{14}–C_{15}	—	0.01 mg/L
>C_{16}	–	–

This category of chemicals was evaluated under the Organisation for Economic Co-operation and Development (OECD) high production volume chemicals program. No unacceptable environmental risks were identified.

== Table with common names ==
This table lists some alkyl alcohols. Note that in general the alcohols with even numbers of carbon atoms have common names, since they are found in nature, whereas those with odd numbers of carbon atoms generally do not have a common name.

Name	Carbon atoms	Branches/saturation	Formula
tert-Butyl alcohol	4 carbon atoms	branched	C_{4}H_{10}O
tert-Amyl alcohol	5 carbon atoms	branched	C_{5}H_{12}O
3-Methyl-3-pentanol	6 carbon atoms	branched	C_{6}H_{14}O
1-Heptanol (enanthic alcohol)	7 carbon atoms		C_{7}H_{16}O
1-Octanol (capryl alcohol)	8 carbon atoms		C_{8}H_{18}O
Pelargonic alcohol (1-nonanol)	9 carbon atoms		C_{9}H_{20}O
1-Decanol (decyl alcohol, capric alcohol)	10 carbon atoms		C_{10}H_{22}O
Undecyl alcohol (1-undecanol, undecanol, Hendecanol)	11 carbon atoms		C_{11}H_{24}O
Lauryl alcohol (dodecanol, 1-dodecanol)	12 carbon atoms		C_{12}H_{26}O
Tridecyl alcohol (1-tridecanol, tridecanol, isotridecanol)	13 carbon atoms		C_{13}H_{28}O
Myristyl alcohol (1-tetradecanol)	14 carbon atoms		C_{14}H_{30}O
Pentadecyl alcohol (1-pentadecanol, pentadecanol)	15 carbon atoms		C_{15}H_{32}O
Cetyl alcohol (1-hexadecanol)	16 carbon atoms		C_{16}H_{34}O
Palmitoleyl alcohol (cis-9-hexadecen-1-ol)	16 carbon atoms	unsaturated	C_{16}H_{32}O
Heptadecyl alcohol (1-n-heptadecanol, heptadecanol)	17 carbon atoms		C_{17}H_{36}O
Stearyl alcohol (1-octadecanol)	18 carbon atoms		C_{18}H_{38}O
Oleyl alcohol (1-octadecenol)	18 carbon atoms	unsaturated	C_{18}H_{36}O
Nonadecyl alcohol (1-nonadecanol)	19 carbon atoms		C_{19}H_{40}O
Arachidyl alcohol (1-eicosanol)	20 carbon atoms		C_{20}H_{42}O
Heneicosyl alcohol (1-heneicosanol)	21 carbon atoms		C_{21}H_{44}O
Behenyl alcohol (1-docosanol)	22 carbon atoms		C_{22}H_{46}O
Erucyl alcohol (cis-13-docosen-1-ol)	22 carbon atoms	unsaturated	C_{22}H_{44}O
Lignoceryl alcohol (1-tetracosanol)	24 carbon atoms		C_{24}H_{50}O
Ceryl alcohol (1-hexacosanol)	26 carbon atoms		C_{26}H_{54}O
1-Heptacosanol	27 carbon atoms		C_{27}H_{56}O
Montanyl alcohol, cluytyl alcohol, or 1-octacosanol	28 carbon atoms		C_{28}H_{58}O
1-Nonacosanol	29 carbon atoms		C_{29}H_{60}O
Myricyl alcohol, melissyl alcohol, or 1-triacontanol	30 carbon atoms		C_{30}H_{62}O
1-Dotriacontanol (Lacceryl alcohol)	32 carbon atoms		C_{32}H_{66}O
Geddyl alcohol (1-tetratriacontanol)	34 carbon atoms		C_{34}H_{70}O
