= Undecylic acid =

11-Carbon fatty acid

Names
- IUPAC name Undecanoic acid
- Other names Hendecanoic acid

Identifiers
CAS Number	112-37-8
3D model (JSmol)	Interactive image
ChEBI	CHEBI:32368
ChEMBL	ChEMBL108030
ChemSpider	7888
ECHA InfoCard	100.003.604
EC Number	203-964-2
IUPHAR/BPS	5533
KEGG	C17715
PubChem CID	8180
UNII	138ON3IIQG
CompTox Dashboard (EPA)	DTXSID8021690
- InChI: InChI=1S/C11H22O2/c1-2-3-4-5-6-7-8-9-10-11(12)13/h2-10H2,1H3,(H,12,13) Key: ZDPHROOEEOARMN-UHFFFAOYSA-N
- SMILES: O=C(O)CCCCCCCCCC

Properties
Chemical formula	C_{11}H_{22}O_{2}
Molar mass	186.29 g/mol
Appearance	Colourless crystals
Density	0.89 g/cm^{3}
Melting point	28.6 °C (83.5 °F; 301.8 K)
Boiling point	284 °C (543 °F; 557 K)
Viscosity	mPa·s

Structure
Dipole moment	D

Hazards
- Occupational safety and health (OHS/OSH)
Main hazards	Corrosive
- GHS labelling
Pictograms	(GHS07: Exclamation mark)
Signal word	Warning
Hazard statements	H315, H319, H335
Precautionary statements	P261, P264, P271, P280, P302+P352, P304+P340, P305+P351+P338, P312, P321, P332+P313, P337+P313, P362, P403+P233, P405, P501
NFPA 704 (fire diamond)	3 2
Flash point	113 °C (235 °F; 386 K)

Related compounds
Related fatty acids	Decanoic acid, Lauric acid
Related compounds	Undecanol
- Except where otherwise noted, data are given for materials in their standard state (at 25 °C [77 °F], 100 kPa). verify (what is ?) Infobox references

Undecylic acid (systematically named undecanoic acid) is a carboxylic acid with chemical formula CH_{3}(CH_{2})_{9}COOH. It is often used as an antifungal agent, to treat ringworm and athlete's foot, for example. Like decanoic acid, it has a distinctive, unpleasant odor.

It is a natural human metabolite, found in trace amounts in human breast milk and infant formulas.

== Uses ==
Undecanoic acid is employed as a chemical intermediate used in producing synthetic lubricants, plasticizers, industrial coatings, and fragrance compounds.

It is often used as an antifungal agent, to treat ringworm and athlete's foot among others.

Its therapeutic efficacy was first recognized in the 1940s in treating superficial fungal diseases affecting military troops stationed in highly humid environments, such as Southeast Asia.

== See also ==
- List of saturated fatty acids
