= 1-Octacosanol =

28-carbon primary fatty alcohol

Names
- Preferred IUPAC name Octacosan-1-ol
- Other names n-Octacosanol; Octacosyl alcohol; Octanosol; Montanyl alcohol; Cluytyl alcohol

Identifiers
CAS Number	557-61-9
3D model (JSmol)	Interactive image
ChEBI	CHEBI:28243
ChemSpider	61689
ECHA InfoCard	100.008.348
KEGG	C08387
MeSH	1-octacosanol
PubChem CID	68406
UNII	81I2215OVK
CompTox Dashboard (EPA)	DTXSID1025803
- InChI: InChI=1S/C28H58O/c1-2-3-4-5-6-7-8-9-10-11-12-13-14-15-16-17-18-19-20-21-22-23-24-25-26-27-28-29/h29H,2-28H2,1H3 Key: CNNRPFQICPFDPO-UHFFFAOYSA-N; InChI=1/C28H58O/c1-2-3-4-5-6-7-8-9-10-11-12-13-14-15-16-17-18-19-20-21-22-23-24-25-26-27-28-29/h29H,2-28H2,1H3 Key: CNNRPFQICPFDPO-UHFFFAOYAC
- SMILES: OCCCCCCCCCCCCCCCCCCCCCCCCCCCC

Properties
Chemical formula	C_{28}H_{58}O
Molar mass	410.771 g·mol^{−1}
Melting point	83 °C (181 °F; 356 K)
- Except where otherwise noted, data are given for materials in their standard state (at 25 °C [77 °F], 100 kPa). verify (what is ?) Infobox references

1-Octacosanol (also known as n-octacosanol, octacosyl alcohol, cluytyl alcohol, montanyl alcohol) is a straight-chain aliphatic 28-carbon primary fatty alcohol that is common in the epicuticular waxes of plants, including the leaves of many species of Eucalyptus, of most forage and cereal grasses, of Acacia, Trifolium, Pisum and many other legume genera among many others, sometimes as the major wax constituent. Octacosanol also occurs in wheat germ.

== Chemistry ==
Octacosanol is insoluble in water but freely soluble in low molecular-weight alkanes and in chloroform.

== Biological effects ==
Octacosanol is the main component in the mixture policosanol. Octacosanol has been subject to preliminary study for its potential benefit for patients with Parkinson's disease. Studies have also found that octacosanol may inhibit the production of cholesterol. In mice, octacosanol reduces stress and restores stress-affected sleep back to normal.
