= Capryl alcohol =

Capryl alcohol may refer to:

- commonly yet incorrectly to one of several isomers of octanol, typically 1-octanol, being confused for the proper caprylyl alcohol
- correctly yet uncommonly to one of several isomers of decanol, typically 1-decanol
