= Solena =

Solena may refer to:

- Solena (bivalve), a genus of bivalves in the family Solenidae
- Solena (plant), a genus of plants in the family Cucurbitaceae
- Solena, a genus of plants in the family Rubiaceae, synonym of Posoqueria
