= 1-Tetradecanol =

- Skeletal formula

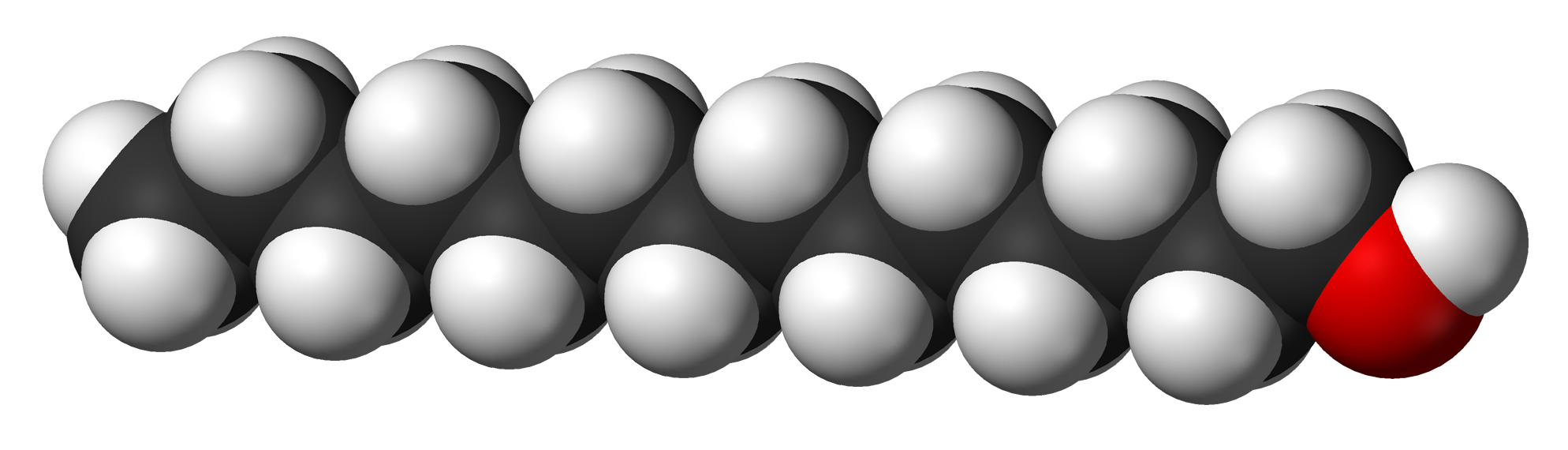
- Space-filling model

Names
- Preferred IUPAC name Tetradecan-1-ol
- Other names Myristyl alcohol Tetradecyl alcohol

Identifiers
CAS Number	112-72-1
3D model (JSmol)	Interactive image
ChEBI	CHEBI:77417
ChEMBL	ChEMBL24022
ChemSpider	7917
ECHA InfoCard	100.003.637
EC Number	204-000-3
KEGG	D05097
PubChem CID	8209
UNII	V42034O9PU
CompTox Dashboard (EPA)	DTXSID9026926
- InChI: InChI=1S/C14H30O/c1-2-3-4-5-6-7-8-9-10-11-12-13-14-15/h15H,2-14H2,1H3 Key: HLZKNKRTKFSKGZ-UHFFFAOYSA-N; InChI=1/C14H30O/c1-2-3-4-5-6-7-8-9-10-11-12-13-14-15/h15H,2-14H2,1H3 Key: HLZKNKRTKFSKGZ-UHFFFAOYAP
- SMILES: OCCCCCCCCCCCCCC

Properties
Chemical formula	C_{14}H_{30}O
Molar mass	214.393 g·mol^{−1}
Density	0.824 g/cm^{3}
Melting point	38 °C (100 °F; 311 K)
Boiling point	260 °C (500 °F; 533 K)

Hazards
- GHS labelling
Pictograms	(GHS07: Exclamation mark) (GHS09: Environmental hazard)
Signal word	Warning
Hazard statements	H315, H319, H410, H411, H412
Precautionary statements	P264, P264+P265, P273, P280, P302+P352, P305+P351+P338, P321, P332+P317, P337+P317, P362+P364, P391, P501
- Except where otherwise noted, data are given for materials in their standard state (at 25 °C [77 °F], 100 kPa). verify (what is ?) Infobox references

1-Tetradecanol, or commonly myristyl alcohol (from Myristica fragrans – the nutmeg plant), is a straight-chain saturated fatty alcohol, with the molecular formula C_{14}H_{30}O or CH_{3}(CH_{2})_{13}OH. It is a white waxy solid that is practically insoluble in water, soluble in diethyl ether, and slightly soluble in ethanol.

== Production ==
1-Tetradecanol may be prepared by the hydrogenation of myristic acid (or its esters); myristic acid itself can be found in nutmeg (from where it gains its name) but is also present in palm kernel oil and coconut oil and it is from these that the majority of 1-tetradecanol is produced. It may also be produced from petrochemical feedstocks via the Ziegler process.

== Uses ==
As with other fatty alcohols, 1-tetradecanol is used as an ingredient in cosmetics such as cold creams for its emollient properties. It is also used as an intermediate in the chemical synthesis of other products such as surfactants.

== Toxicity ==
Like other fatty alcohols, myristyl alcohol has very low acute toxicity, with LD50 >5000 mg/kg (oral, rat).
