= 1-Heneicosanol =

Names
- Preferred IUPAC name Henicosan-1-ol
- Other names Heneicosanol; Heneicosyl alcohol; Henicosan-1-ol

Identifiers
CAS Number	15594-90-8
3D model (JSmol)	Interactive image
ChEBI	CHEBI:78410
ChemSpider	76686
ECHA InfoCard	100.036.051
PubChem CID	85014
UNII	15BB7P0F03
CompTox Dashboard (EPA)	DTXSID70935330
- InChI: InChI=1S/C21H44O/c1-2-3-4-5-6-7-8-9-10-11-12-13-14-15-16-17-18-19-20-21-22/h22H,2-21H2,1H3 Key: FIPPFBHCBUDBRR-UHFFFAOYSA-N
- SMILES: CCCCCCCCCCCCCCCCCCCCCO

Properties
Chemical formula	C_{21}H_{44}O
Molar mass	312.582 g·mol^{−1}
Appearance	White, waxy solid
Melting point	70 °C (158 °F; 343 K)
Boiling point	366 °C (691 °F; 639 K) (estimated, at 760 mmHg)
- Except where otherwise noted, data are given for materials in their standard state (at 25 °C [77 °F], 100 kPa). Infobox references

1-Heneicosanol (also known as heneicosyl alcohol or heneicosanol) is a long-chain primary alcohol and fatty alcohol with 21 carbon atoms and the molecular formula C_{21}H_{44}O. At room temperature, it is a waxy white solid with a melting point close to 69 °C. As a typical long-chain aliphatic alcohol, it is highly hydrophobic and practically insoluble in water. Similar to other fatty alcohols, 1-heneicosanol is used as an intermediate and functional component in the manufacture of surfactants, lubricants, polymer materials and cosmetic formulations.

== Structure and properties ==
1-Heneicosanol is the C_{21} member of the series of linear, saturated primary alcohols derived formally from heneicosane by substitution of a terminal hydrogen atom with a hydroxyl group. It is classified as a long-chain fatty alcohol.

Commercial material is typically obtained as a white powder or low-melting wax with a reported melting range of about 68–71 °C. A safety data compilation and estimation methods indicate a high normal boiling point of around 366 °C at 760 mmHg, consistent with its long carbon chain. The compound has very low solubility in water and a high octanol/water partition coefficient (log P), reflecting its pronounced hydrophobic character.

== Natural occurrence ==
1-Heneicosanol naturally occurs in various flowering plants, such as the tomato (Solanum lycopersicum), where it is one of the constituents of the cuticular surface wax, and in napa cabbage (Brassica rapa subsp. pekinensis).

It is also a component of plant-derived policosanol mixtures. A study of green tea (Camellia sinensis) leaves identified heneicosanol (C_{21}-OH) among the major long-chain aliphatic alcohols present in policosanol fractions. Related work has reported the presence of 1-heneicosanol in herbal tea blends based on Himalayan-region plants used as green and black tea substitutes.

A 2021 study analyzing the chemical composition of cow urine by gas chromatography–mass spectrometry found that 1-heneicosanol is one of its major constituents. Subsequent in silico work has examined cow-urine-derived 1-heneicosanol as a ligand for bacterial target proteins using molecular docking and ADME prediction approaches.

== Uses ==
As a representative long-chain fatty alcohol, 1-heneicosanol is used in research and in industrial formulation work as:

- an intermediate or building block in the synthesis of non-ionic and other surfactants and related functional additives;
- a component of lubricant and plastic additive systems, including thermoplastic polyurethanes, where long-chain alcohols are used to modify flexibility and permeability;
- a minor constituent of policosanol-type mixtures employed in cosmetics and personal-care products as part of the lipid phase of creams and emulsions.

Because of its chain length and structural similarity to other fatty alcohols, 1-heneicosanol is also used as a reference compound and analytical standard in studies of plant waxes, policosanol mixtures and related lipid fractions.

== Safety ==
Available safety data sheets describe 1-heneicosanol as a low-volatility solid that is not classified as hazardous under European CLP regulations, but which may cause mild irritation to the skin, eyes and respiratory tract on contact or inhalation of dust. Standard laboratory precautions such as avoiding dust formation, using local exhaust ventilation and wearing eye and skin protection are recommended.

== See also ==
- Fatty alcohol
- Behenyl alcohol
- Heneicosanoic acid
