= 1-Dotriacontanol =

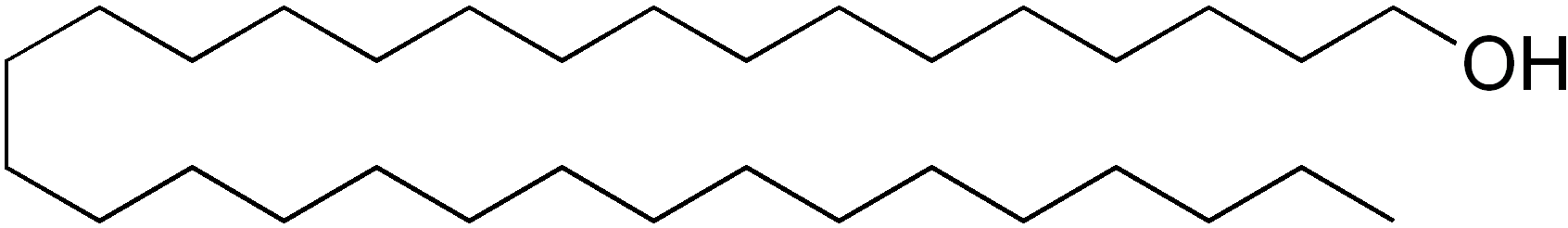

Names
- Preferred IUPAC name Dotriacontan-1-ol

Identifiers
CAS Number	6624-79-9
3D model (JSmol)	Interactive image
ChemSpider	86761
PubChem CID	96117
UNII	82J5YYF71H
CompTox Dashboard (EPA)	DTXSID10873227
- InChI: InChI=1S/C32H66O/c1-2-3-4-5-6-7-8-9-10-11-12-13-14-15-16-17-18-19-20-21-22-23-24-25-26-27-28-29-30-31-32-33/h33H,2-32H2,1H3 Key: QOEHNLSDMADWEF-UHFFFAOYSA-N; InChI=1/C32H66O/c1-2-3-4-5-6-7-8-9-10-11-12-13-14-15-16-17-18-19-20-21-22-23-24-25-26-27-28-29-30-31-32-33/h33H,2-32H2,1H3 Key: QOEHNLSDMADWEF-UHFFFAOYAH
- SMILES: OCCCCCCCCCCCCCCCCCCCCCCCCCCCCCCCC

Properties
Chemical formula	C_{32}H_{66}O
Molar mass	466.879 g·mol^{−1}
- Except where otherwise noted, data are given for materials in their standard state (at 25 °C [77 °F], 100 kPa). verify (what is ?) Infobox references

1-Dotriacontanol is a fatty alcohol with 32 carbon atoms. It has been found in Prosopis glandulosa and Euphorbia granulata.
