= 1-Heptadecanol =

Primary alcohol with 17 carbons

Heptadecan-1-ol

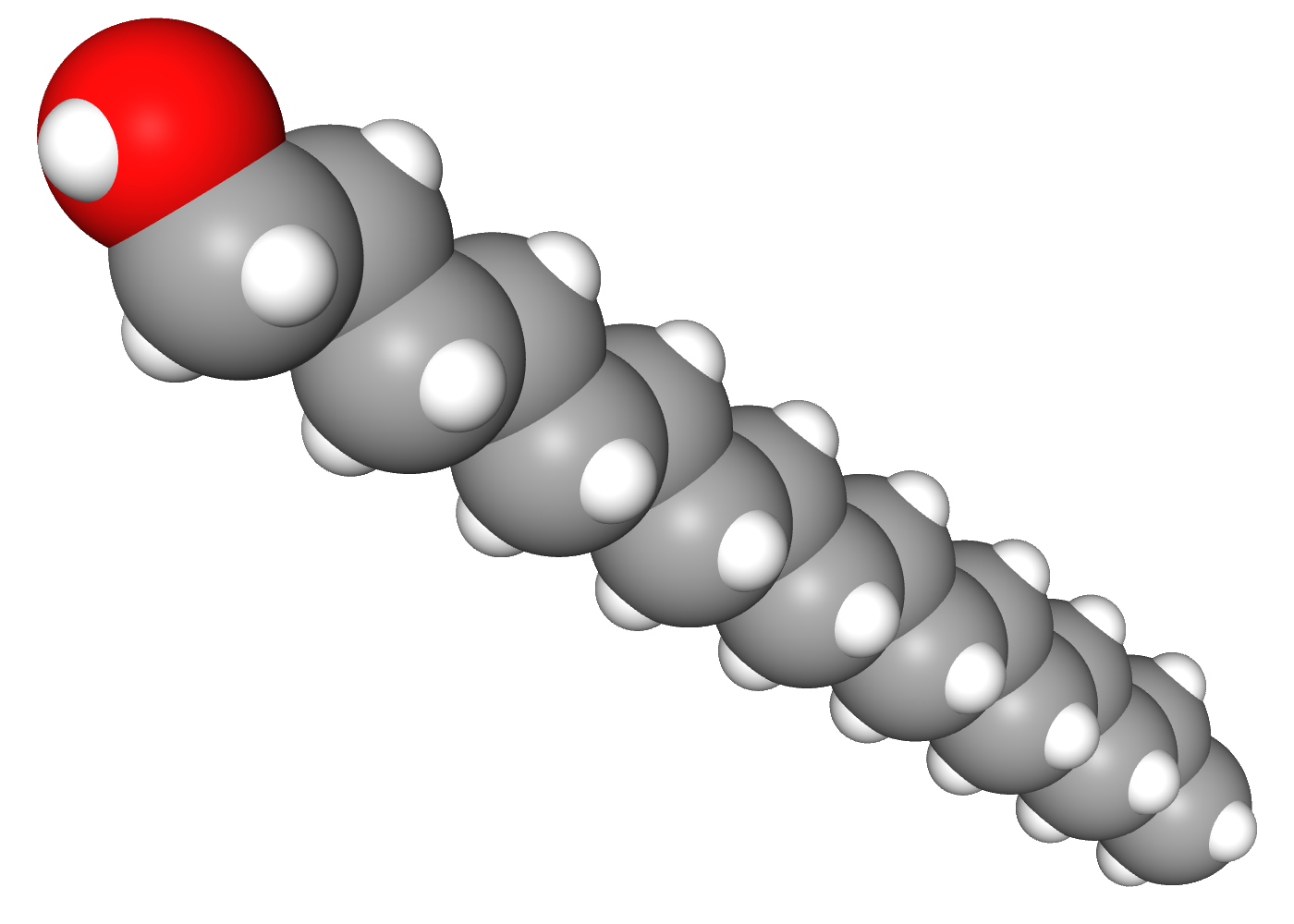

Names
- Preferred IUPAC name Heptadecan-1-ol
- Other names: heptadecan-1-ol; heptadecanol; heptadecyl alcohol

Identifiers
CAS Number	1454-85-9
3D model (JSmol)	Interactive image
ChEBI	CHEBI:77470
ChEMBL	ChEMBL278989
ChemSpider	14348
ECHA InfoCard	100.014.484
EC Number	215-932-5
PubChem CID	15076
UNII	N3IL85TMCX
CompTox Dashboard (EPA)	DTXSID3051460
- InChI: InChI=1S/C17H36O/c1-2-3-4-5-6-7-8-9-10-11-12-13-14-15-16-17-18/h18H,2-17H2,1H3 Key: GOQYKNQRPGWPLP-UHFFFAOYSA-N
- SMILES: CCCCCCCCCCCCCCCCCO

Properties
Chemical formula	C_{17}H_{36}O
Molar mass	256.474 g·mol^{−1}
Melting point	54 °C (129 °F; 327 K)
Boiling point	309 °C (588 °F; 582 K)
Solubility in water	3.14E^{−08} mol
log P	8.248

Hazards
Flash point	155 °C (311 °F; 428 K)
- Except where otherwise noted, data are given for materials in their standard state (at 25 °C [77 °F], 100 kPa). Infobox references

Heptadecan-1-ol or heptadecyl alcohol is a saturated fatty alcohol with the formula C_{17}H_{36}O or CH_{3}(CH_{2})_{16}OH.
