= Alcohol-forming fatty acyl-CoA reductase =

Class of enzymes

Identifiers
- EC no.: 1.2.1.84

Databases
- BRENDA: enzyme data
- ExPASy: NiceZyme view
- KEGG: enzyme entry
- MetaCyc: metabolic pathway
- Rhea: reactions
- PDB structures: RCSB PDB PDBe PDBsum
Search
- PMC: articles
- PubMed: articles
- NCBI: proteins

Alcohol-forming fatty acyl-CoA reductase (EC 1.2.1.84, FAR (gene)) is an enzyme with systematic name long-chain acyl-CoA:NADPH reductase. This enzyme catalyses the following chemical reaction

a long-chain acyl-CoA + 2 NADPH + 2 H^{+} $\rightleftharpoons$ a long-chain alcohol + 2 NADP^{+} + coenzyme A

The enzyme has been characterized from the plant Simmondsia chinensis. There are two known human isozymes, encoded by the genes FAR1 and FAR2.
