= Tridecanal =

Names
- Other names Aldehyde 13-13

Identifiers
CAS Number	10486-19-8
3D model (JSmol)	Interactive image
ChEBI	CHEBI:89816
ChEMBL	ChEMBL2228568
ChemSpider	23643
ECHA InfoCard	100.030.900
EC Number	234-004-0
PubChem CID	25311
UNII	193923TA82
CompTox Dashboard (EPA)	DTXSID4021682
- InChI: InChI=1S/C13H26O/c1-2-3-4-5-6-7-8-9-10-11-12-13-14/h13H,2-12H2,1H3 Key: BGEHHAVMRVXCGR-UHFFFAOYSA-N
- SMILES: CCCCCCCCCCCCC=O

Properties
Chemical formula	C_{13}H_{26}O
Molar mass	198.350 g·mol^{−1}
Appearance	colorless liquid
Density	0.825±0.06 g/cm3
Melting point	14 °C (57 °F; 287 K)
Boiling point	126–138 °C (259–280 °F; 399–411 K) 15 Torr

Hazards
- GHS labelling
Pictograms	(GHS05: Corrosive) (GHS07: Exclamation mark) (GHS09: Environmental hazard)
Signal word	Danger
Hazard statements	H314, H315, H319, H335, H411
Precautionary statements	P260, P264, P264+P265, P271, P273, P280, P301+P330+P331, P302+P352, P302+P361+P354, P304+P340, P305+P351+P338, P305+P354+P338, P316, P317, P319, P321, P332+P317, P337+P317, P362+P364, P363, P391, P403+P233, P405, P501
- Except where otherwise noted, data are given for materials in their standard state (at 25 °C [77 °F], 100 kPa). Infobox references

Tridecanal is an organic compound with the formula C_{13}H_{26}O CH_{3}(CH_{2})_{11}CHO. A colorless oily liquid, it is the aldehyde derivative of tridecane. It is produced by hydroformylation of 1-dodecene. Hydrogenation of tridecanal gives 1-tridecanol.

== Occurrence and use ==
It is used as a fragrance and is well-tolerated. It is a trace component emitted from the combustion of diesel fuel and exposure of synthetic carpets to ozone.
