= 1-Nonadecanol =

Primary alcohol with 19 carbons

nonadecan-1-ol

Names
- Preferred IUPAC name Nonadecan-1-ol
- Other names: nonadecanol; nonadecyl alcohol

Identifiers
CAS Number	1454-84-8
3D model (JSmol)	Interactive image
ChEBI	CHEBI:197470
ChemSpider	72522
ECHA InfoCard	100.014.483
EC Number	215-930-4
PubChem CID	80281
UNII	A465X576KO
CompTox Dashboard (EPA)	DTXSID90870875
- InChI: InChI=1S/C19H40O/c1-2-3-4-5-6-7-8-9-10-11-12-13-14-15-16-17-18-19-20/h20H,2-19H2,1H3 Key: XGFDHKJUZCCPKQ-UHFFFAOYSA-N
- SMILES: CCCCCCCCCCCCCCCCCCCO

Properties
Chemical formula	C_{19}H_{40}O
Molar mass	284.528 g·mol^{−1}
Melting point	63.3 °C (145.9 °F; 336.4 K)
Boiling point	351 °C (664 °F; 624 K) predicted
log P	9.386
- Except where otherwise noted, data are given for materials in their standard state (at 25 °C [77 °F], 100 kPa). Infobox references

1-Nonadecanol or nonadecyl alcohol is a saturated fatty alcohol with the formula C_{19}H_{40}O or CH_{3}(CH_{2})_{18}OH.

1-Nonadecanol is one of the constituents of supercritical carbon dioxide (SC-CO_{2}) essential oil of freshly collected aerial parts of Heracleum thomsonii (Umbelliferae).
