= Fatty acyl-CoA reductase 2 =

Enzyme found in humans

FAR2

Identifiers
- Aliases: FAR2, MLSTD1, SDR10E2, HEL-S-81, fatty acyl-CoA reductase 2
- External IDs: OMIM: 616156; MGI: 2687035; GeneCards: FAR2
Enzyme activity
EC #	BRENDA	ExPASy	KEGG	MetaCyc
1.2.1.84	↗	↗	↗	↗

Gene location (Human)
Chr.	Chromosome 12 (human)
Band	12p11.22	Start	29,149,016 bp
Band	12p11.22	End	29,341,121 bp

Gene location (Mouse)
Chr.	Chromosome 6 (mouse)
Band	6|6 G3	Start	147,948,757 bp
Band	6|6 G3	End	148,084,256 bp
RNA expression pattern
Bgee	Human / Mouse (ortholog); Top expressed in: skin of thigh; mucosa of transverse colon; bone marrow cell; mucosa of sigmoid colon; rectum; vulva; Achilles tendon; prefrontal cortex; trabecular bone; epithelium of colon / Top expressed in: skin of external ear; skin of abdomen; lip; medial dorsal nucleus; medial geniculate nucleus; lateral geniculate nucleus; skin of back; jejunum; duodenum; Paneth cell; More reference expression data
BioGPS	n/a
Gene ontology
Molecular function	fatty-acyl-CoA reductase (alcohol-forming) activity; oxidoreductase activity; alcohol-forming fatty acyl-CoA reductase activity
Cellular component	integral component of membrane; peroxisomal membrane; peroxisomal matrix; membrane; integral component of peroxisomal membrane; peroxisome
Biological process	long-chain fatty-acyl-CoA metabolic process; lipid metabolism; wax biosynthetic process
Sources:Amigo / QuickGO
Orthologs
Databases	NCBI: entry; OMA: entry
Species	Human	Mouse
Entrez	55711	330450
Ensembl	ENSG00000064763	ENSMUSG00000030303
UniProt	Q96K12	Q7TNT2
RefSeq (mRNA)	NM_001271783; NM_001271784; NM_018099	NM_178797; NM_001347516
RefSeq (protein)	NP_001258712; NP_001258713; NP_060569	NP_001334445; NP_848912
Location (UCSC)	Chr 12: 29.15 – 29.34 Mb	Chr 6: 147.95 – 148.08 Mb
PubMed search
- Wikidata
View/Edit Human	View/Edit Mouse

Fatty acyl-CoA reductase 2 is an enzyme that in humans is encoded by the FAR2 gene. This enzyme produces fatty alcohols from saturated long-chain fatty acids attached to coenzyme A. These fatty alcohols are then used to produce other molecules such as ether lipids (a component of cell membranes) and wax esters (a component of sebum). Unlike fatty acyl-CoA reductase 1, this enzyme does not act on unsaturated fatty acids.

== Function ==
FAR2 (like FAR1) is an enzyme found on the membrane of the peroxisomes. As an alcohol-forming fatty acyl-CoA reductase, FAR2 catalyses the following chemical reaction:

a long-chain fatty acyl-CoA + 2 NADPH + 2 H^{+} → a long-chain alcohol + 2 NADP^{+} + coenzyme A

FAR2 has high affinity for C16 and C18 fatty acyl-CoA, and can also act on very long-chain and ultra-long-chain fatty acyl-CoA. In addition, it shows some low activity towards shorter chains. However, it is does not act on unsaturated C16 or C18 fatty acyl-CoA, which differentiates it from FAR1.
