= 1-Triacontanol =

Straight-chain primary alcohol with formula C30H62O

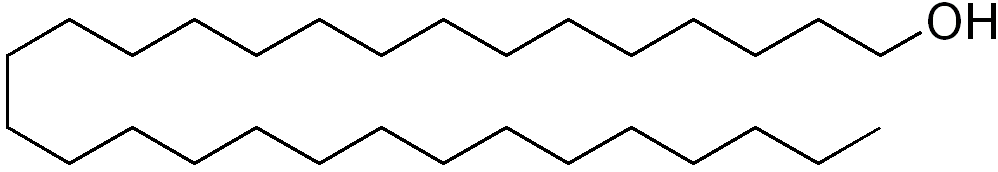

Names
- Preferred IUPAC name Triacontan-1-ol
- Other names 1-Triacontanol n-Triacontanol; Melissyl alcohol Myricyl alcohol

Identifiers
CAS Number	593-50-0
3D model (JSmol)	Interactive image
Beilstein Reference	1711965
ChEBI	CHEBI:28409
ChEMBL	ChEMBL1079147
ChemSpider	62194
ECHA InfoCard	100.008.905
EC Number	209-794-5
KEGG	C08392
PubChem CID	68972
UNII	767RD0E90B
CompTox Dashboard (EPA)	DTXSID5029188
- InChI: InChI=1S/C30H62O/c1-2-3-4-5-6-7-8-9-10-11-12-13-14-15-16-17-18-19-20-21-22-23-24-25-26-27-28-29-30-31/h31H,2-30H2,1H3 Key: REZQBEBOWJAQKS-UHFFFAOYSA-N; InChI=1/C30H62O/c1-2-3-4-5-6-7-8-9-10-11-12-13-14-15-16-17-18-19-20-21-22-23-24-25-26-27-28-29-30-31/h31H,2-30H2,1H3 Key: REZQBEBOWJAQKS-UHFFFAOYAU
- SMILES: OCCCCCCCCCCCCCCCCCCCCCCCCCCCCCC

Properties
Chemical formula	C_{30}H_{62}O
Molar mass	438.81 g/mol
Density	0.777 g/ml at 95 °C
Melting point	87 °C (189 °F; 360 K)
Solubility in water	Insoluble
- Except where otherwise noted, data are given for materials in their standard state (at 25 °C [77 °F], 100 kPa). verify (what is ?) Infobox references

1-Triacontanol (n-triacontanol) is a fatty alcohol of the general formula C_{30}H_{62}O, also known as melissyl alcohol or myricyl alcohol. It is found in plant cuticle waxes and in beeswax. Triacontanol is a growth stimulant for many plants, most notably roses, in which it rapidly increases the number of basal breaks. 1-Triacontanol is a natural plant growth regulator. It has been widely used to enhance the yield of various crops around the world, mainly in Asia. Triacontanol has been reported to increase the growth of plants by enhancing the rates of photosynthesis, protein biosynthesis, the transport of nutrients in a plant and enzyme activity, reducing complex carbohydrates among many other purposes. The fatty alcohol appears to increase the physiological efficiency of plant cells and boost the potential of the cells responsible for the growth and maturity of a plant.

== History ==
Triacontanol was first isolated in 1933 from alfalfa wax. It was identified as a saturated straight chain primary alcohol. Triacontanol is found in various plant species as a minor component of the epicuticular wax. In wheat, triacontanol is about 3-4% of the leaf wax. The effects of triacontanol may also be seen when a chopped alfafa plant is placed in close proximity to the seedlings and various crop seeds. A substantial increase in yield and growth has been seen in different plants, such as cucumber, tomatoes, wheat, maize, lettuce, and rice.

== Characteristics ==
Triacontanol does not react the same way in all plant species. The effects of triacontanol various in terms of photosynthesis and the yield manipulation in plant species. The effects on C-3 plants and C-4 plants. In tomato plant (C-3 plant), the treatment of triacontanol increases the dry leaf weight and inhibited the photosynthesis by 27% in dry leaves, whereas in the maize plants no change in photosynthesis occurs whether treated by triacontanol or not.

Although, the basic effect of treating seedlings of various plant species is an increase in plant growth, photosynthesis and the yield of the crops, the effects of triacontanol are not the same in every plant species. Some exhibit these symptoms while some show no response to the treatment to triacontanol. Different studies reveal that the effects of triacontanol differs with the amounts of the triacontanol used to treat the plant. A much higher dose of triacontanol could also have adverse effects on the growth of a plant. Triacontanol has been reported to increase productivity of some plants that have some therapeutic properties. In addition, the effects of triacontanol are observed in opium and morphine production.

== Functionality ==
There are numerous corporations making synthetic triacontanol for enhancing the crop yield and pest resistance in the crops. Triacontanol improves the rate of cell division in a plant that produces larger roots and shoots. It has been shown that if triacontanol is applied during the maximized growth period of a plant in an appropriate amount, it enhances the enzymatic activity in the roots and hormone functionality increasing the overall performance of the plant. Triacontanol basically operates by enhancing the basic functionality of the plant like increasing the rate of photosynthesis and producing more sugar such as glucose. When photosynthesis operates efficiently, the plant produce more sugars and absorb more sunlight. The plant then send more sugars to the rhizosphere via the root system where the growth, respiration and nutrient exchange take place in the vicinity of the soil. Availability of more sugars lead to more respiration and nutrient exchange between the plants and the microorganisms in the soil. when the microbes receive more sugars from the plant, it increases the microbial activity in the root zone and they perform more efficiently in mining the nutrients like in the case of nitrogen fixation. These microorganisms particularly trace the nutrients essential for the soil. These nutrients are further used by the plants to build more complex nutrients and compounds essential for rapid growth and defence from certain other microbes. These complex compounds maximize the yield of the crop. Overall, despite other benefits from adequate amounts of triacontanol, the effect of enhanced photosynthesis may increase the plant outcomes.

== Synthesis of triacontanol ==
There are several chemical pathways via which triacontanol can be artificially synthesized. One method includes an organic compound succinic anhydride and a carboxylic acid docosanoic acid that have been used to attach the different carbon chains (C4 and C22) on 2 and 5 positions of thiophene, via two acylation sequences. Later, 2-5 substituted thiophene is reacted for desulfurization using Raney Nickel. It produces triacontanoic acid which can be reduced with lithium aluminium hydride (LAH) to produce 1-triacontanol.

Another method of synthesizing triacontanol focuses on the high yield with the easily available and feasible compounds that can form triacontanol through some chemical reactions in laboratory settings. 1-octadecanol or stearyl alcohol and 1,12-dodecanediol. Using the phase transfer system the 1-octadecanol is converted to octadecanal. On the other hand, 1,12-dodecanediol goes through the phase transfer bromination and further reacted with 1-hydroxy-12-triphenylphosphonium bromide. Both the end products of the two compounds undergo Witting reaction to give the product. The resulted mixture is hydrogenated to give triacontanol.

== Physiological effects on some plant species ==
=== Cacao seedlings ===
Cocoa seedlings (Theobroma cacao L.) shows a positive growth in terms of plant length and the leaf size when treated with triacontanol. In a study, the cocoa seedlings when receive an appropriate amount of triacontanol, led to increase in the leaf size, plant length, leaf number as well as the stem diameter of the cocoa plant. which is due to biosynthesis of secondary metabolites which alters the physiology and the biochemistry of the plants. Treating the cocoa plant with excess amount of triacontanol led to inhibition of plant growth and bearing of adverse effects on the plant physiology. The provision of triacontanol rapidly increase the morphogenetic response in the plant during the embryogenesis process. The enhanced response lead to increase in the cell division and cell growth by the growth regulators. Moreover, it also leads to increased shoots and roots of the plant. The whole process results from the formation of new growth and development proteins and new mRNA.

=== Rhizophora apiculata (Mangrove) ===
In the hypocotyl treatment of triacontanol in the mangrove plant resulted in increased root and shoot growth. The rise in the number of primary and secondary roots, the length of roots, height and the biomass resulted from triacontanol treatment. Moreover, the reduction of nitrate reductase as well as increase amount of chlorophylls in the photosystem 1 and 2 observed. However, the increase in the concentration of triacontanol resulted in the decrease of the plant growth. hence, the amount of the alcohol treatment is the driving force for the enhanced results.

=== Cell cultures in vitro ===
Triacontanol also increases the growth of a cell in vitro by increasing the cell number in the culture. It can be attributed to the increase protein formation and rapid cell division induced by triacontanol.

The growth of cell culture in vitro has been done with various plant species to observe the effects of triacontanol. Similar effects of triacontanol can be seen with a variety of plants like rice, wheat, maize, cucumber, and many more.
