= Arachidic acid =

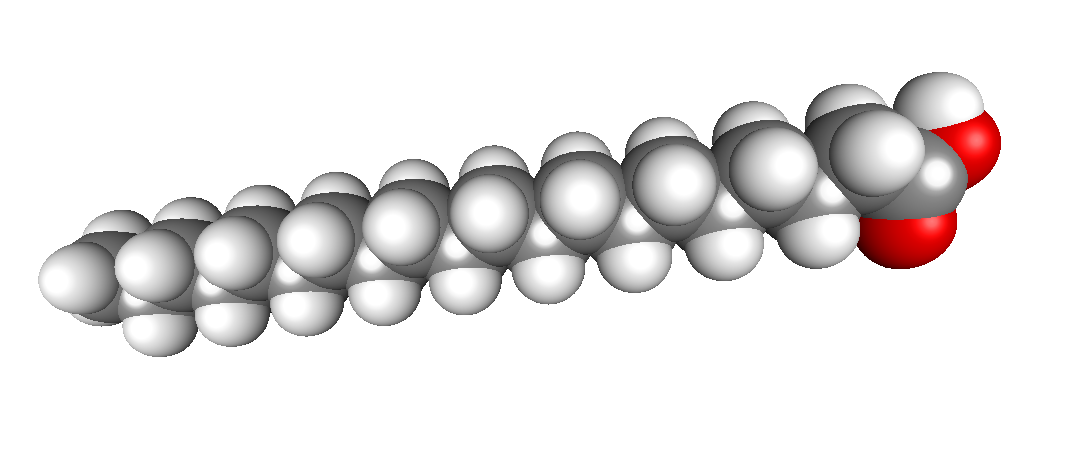

Names
- Preferred IUPAC name Icosanoic acid
- Other names Eicosanoic acid n-Eicosanoic acid Arachidic acid Arachic acid C20:0 (Lipid numbers)

Identifiers
CAS Number	506-30-9
3D model (JSmol)	Interactive image
ChEBI	CHEBI:28822
ChEMBL	ChEMBL1173381
ChemSpider	10035
ECHA InfoCard	100.007.302
KEGG	C06425
PubChem CID	10467
UNII	PQB8MJD4RB
CompTox Dashboard (EPA)	DTXSID1060134
- InChI: InChI=1S/C20H40O2/c1-2-3-4-5-6-7-8-9-10-11-12-13-14-15-16-17-18-19-20(21)22/h2-19H2,1H3,(H,21,22) Key: VKOBVWXKNCXXDE-UHFFFAOYSA-N; InChI=1/C20H40O2/c1-2-3-4-5-6-7-8-9-10-11-12-13-14-15-16-17-18-19-20(21)22/h2-19H2,1H3,(H,21,22) Key: VKOBVWXKNCXXDE-UHFFFAOYAB
- SMILES: O=C(O)CCCCCCCCCCCCCCCCCCC

Properties
Chemical formula	C_{20}H_{40}O_{2}
Molar mass	312.538 g·mol^{−1}
Appearance	White crystalline solid
Density	0.8240 g/cm^{3}
Melting point	75.4 °C (167.7 °F; 348.5 K)
Boiling point	328 °C (622 °F; 601 K)
Solubility in water	Practically insoluble in water

Hazards
Flash point	110 °C (230 °F; 383 K)
- Except where otherwise noted, data are given for materials in their standard state (at 25 °C [77 °F], 100 kPa). verify (what is ?) Infobox references

Arachidic acid, also known as icosanoic acid, is a saturated fatty acid with a 20-carbon chain. It is a minor constituent of cupuaçu butter (7%), perilla oil (0–1%), peanut oil (1.1–1.7%), corn oil (3%), and cocoa butter (1%). The salts and esters of arachidic acid are known as arachidates.

Its name derives from the Latin arachis—peanut. It can be formed by the hydrogenation of arachidonic acid.

Reduction of arachidic acid yields arachidyl alcohol.

Arachidic acid is used for the production of detergents, photographic materials and lubricants.
