= 1-Heptacosanol =

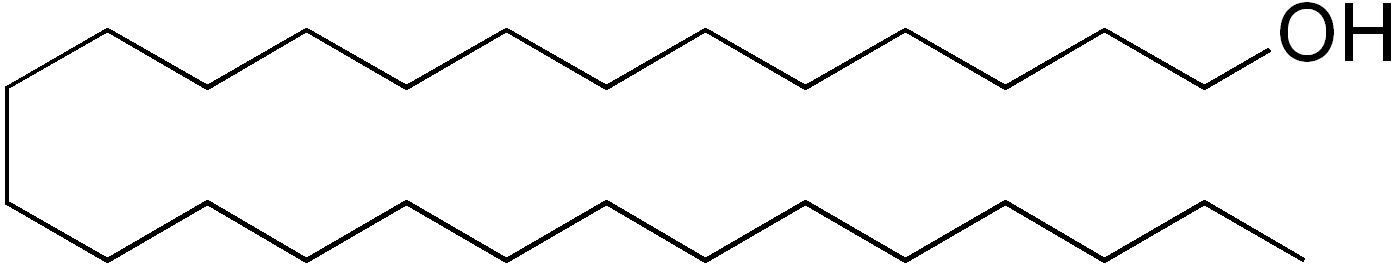

Names
- Preferred IUPAC name Heptacosan-1-ol

Identifiers
CAS Number	2004-39-9
3D model (JSmol)	Interactive image
ChemSpider	67388
ECHA InfoCard	100.016.280
PubChem CID	74822
UNII	VO02AJN4KP
CompTox Dashboard (EPA)	DTXSID20173861
- InChI: InChI=1S/C27H56O/c1-2-3-4-5-6-7-8-9-10-11-12-13-14-15-16-17-18-19-20-21-22-23-24-25-26-27-28/h28H,2-27H2,1H3 Key: ULCZGKYHRYJXAU-UHFFFAOYSA-N; InChI=1/C27H56O/c1-2-3-4-5-6-7-8-9-10-11-12-13-14-15-16-17-18-19-20-21-22-23-24-25-26-27-28/h28H,2-27H2,1H3 Key: ULCZGKYHRYJXAU-UHFFFAOYAR
- SMILES: OCCCCCCCCCCCCCCCCCCCCCCCCCCC

Properties
Chemical formula	C_{27}H_{56}O
Molar mass	396.744 g·mol^{−1}
- Except where otherwise noted, data are given for materials in their standard state (at 25 °C [77 °F], 100 kPa). verify (what is ?) Infobox references

1-Heptacosanol is a fatty alcohol.
