= Capric acid =

10-Carbon fatty acid

Decanoic acid
- Skeletal formula of decanoic acid

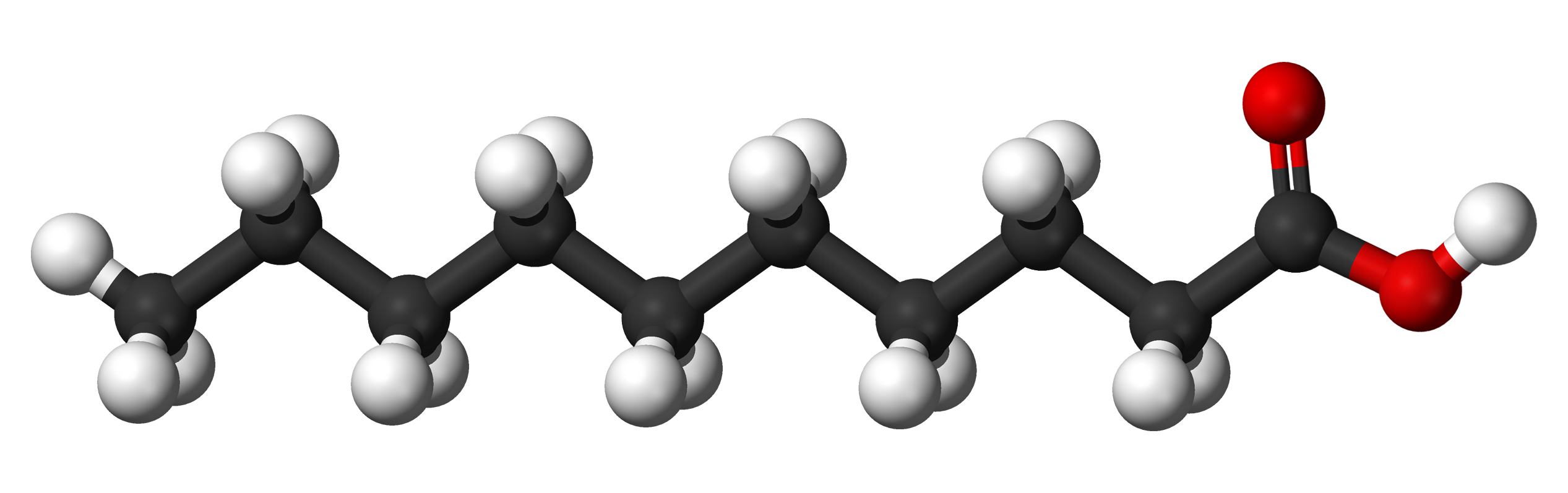
- Ball-and-stick model of decanoic acid

Names
- Preferred IUPAC name Decanoic acid
- Other names Caprinic acid; Caprynic acid; Decoic acid; Decylic acid; 1-Nonanecarboxylic acid; C10:0 (Lipid numbers)

Identifiers
CAS Number	334-48-5; 1002-62-6 (sodium salt)
3D model (JSmol)	Interactive image
ChEBI	CHEBI:30813
ChEMBL	ChEMBL107498
ChemSpider	2863
DrugBank	DB03600
ECHA InfoCard	100.005.798
EC Number	206-376-4
IUPHAR/BPS	5532
KEGG	C01571
PubChem CID	2969
RTECS number	HD9100000
UNII	4G9EDB6V73; 4I820XKV2A (sodium salt)
CompTox Dashboard (EPA)	DTXSID9021554
- InChI: InChI=1S/C10H20O2/c1-2-3-4-5-6-7-8-9-10(11)12/h2-9H2,1H3,(H,11,12) Key: GHVNFZFCNZKVNT-UHFFFAOYSA-N; InChI=1/C10H20O2/c1-2-3-4-5-6-7-8-9-10(11)12/h2-9H2,1H3,(H,11,12) Key: GHVNFZFCNZKVNT-UHFFFAOYAC
- SMILES: O=C(O)CCCCCCCCC

Properties
Chemical formula	C_{10}H_{20}O_{2}
Molar mass	172.268 g·mol^{−1}
Appearance	White crystals
Odor	Strong rancid and unpleasant
Density	0.893 g/cm^{3} (25 °C); 0.8884 g/cm^{3} (35.05 °C); 0.8773 g/cm^{3} (50.17 °C)
Melting point	31.6 °C (88.9 °F; 304.8 K)
Boiling point	268.7 °C (515.7 °F; 541.8 K)
Solubility in water	0.015 g/100 mL (20 °C)
Solubility	Soluble in alcohol, ether, CHCl_{3}, C_{6}H_{6}, CS_{2}, acetone
log P	4.09
Vapor pressure	4.88·10^{−5} kPa (25 °C); 0.1 kPa (108 °C); 2.03 kPa (160 °C)
Acidity (pK_{a})	4.9
Thermal conductivity	0.372 W/m·K (solid); 0.141 W/m·K (liquid)
Refractive index (n_{D})	1.4288 (40 °C)
Viscosity	4.327 cP (50 °C); 2.88 cP (70 °C)

Structure
Crystal structure	Monoclinic (−3.15 °C)
Space group	P2_{1}/c
Lattice constant	a = 23.1 Å, b = 4.973 Å, c = 9.716 Å α = 90°, β = 91.28°, γ = 90°

Thermochemistry
Heat capacity (C)	475.59 J/mol·K
Std enthalpy of formation (Δ_{f}H^{⦵}_{298})	−713.7 kJ/mol
Std enthalpy of combustion (Δ_{c}H^{⦵}_{298})	6079.3 kJ/mol

Hazards
- Occupational safety and health (OHS/OSH)
Main hazards	Medium toxicity
Ingestion hazards	May be toxic
Inhalation hazards	May cause irritation
Skin hazards	May be toxic on contact
- GHS labelling
Pictograms	(GHS07: Exclamation mark)
Signal word	Warning
Hazard statements	H315, H319, H335
Precautionary statements	P261, P305+P351+P338
NFPA 704 (fire diamond)	2 1 0
Flash point	110 °C (230 °F; 383 K)
- Lethal dose or concentration (LD, LC)
LD_{50} (median dose)	10 g/kg (rats, oral)
Safety data sheet (SDS)	External MSDS

Related compounds
Related fatty acids	Nonanoic acid, Undecanoic acid
Related compounds	Decanol; Decanal
- Except where otherwise noted, data are given for materials in their standard state (at 25 °C [77 °F], 100 kPa). verify (what is ?) Infobox references

Capric acid, also known as decanoic acid or decylic acid, is a saturated fatty acid, medium-chain fatty acid (MCFA), and carboxylic acid. Its formula is CH_{3}(CH_{2})_{8}COOH. Salts and esters of decanoic acid are called caprates or decanoates. The term capric acid is derived from the Latin "caper / capra" (goat) because the sweaty, unpleasant smell of the compound is reminiscent of goats.

== Occurrence ==
Capric acid occurs naturally in coconut oil (about 10%) and palm kernel oil (about 4%), otherwise it is uncommon in typical seed oils. It is found in the milk of various mammals and to a lesser extent in other animal fats, as discovered by Michel Eugène Chevreul in 1823.

Two other acids are named after goats: caproic acid (a C6:0 fatty acid) and caprylic acid (a C8:0 fatty acid). Along with capric acid, these total 15% in goat milk fat.

== Production ==
Capric acid can be prepared from oxidation of the primary alcohol decanol by using chromium trioxide (CrO_{3}) oxidant under acidic conditions.

Neutralization of capric acid or saponification of its triglyceride esters with sodium hydroxide yields sodium caprate, CH_{3}(CH_{2})_{8}CO^{−}_{2}Na^{+}. This salt is a component of some types of soap.

== Uses ==
Capric acid is used in the manufacture of esters for artificial fruit flavors and perfumes. It is also used as an intermediate in chemical syntheses. It is used in organic synthesis and industrially in the manufacture of perfumes, lubricants, greases, rubber, dyes, plastics, food additives and pharmaceuticals.

=== Pharmaceuticals ===
Caprate ester prodrugs of various pharmaceuticals are available. Since capric acid is a fatty acid, forming a salt or ester with a drug will increase its lipophilicity and its affinity for adipose tissue. Since distribution of a drug from fatty tissue is usually slow, one may develop a long-acting injectable form of a drug (called a depot injection) by using its caprate form. Some examples of drugs available as a caprate ester include nandrolone (as nandrolone decanoate), fluphenazine (as fluphenazine decanoate), bromperidol (as bromperidol decanoate), and haloperidol (as haloperidol decanoate).

== Effects ==
Capric acid acts as a non-competitive AMPA receptor antagonist at therapeutically relevant concentrations, in a voltage- and subunit-dependent manner, and this is sufficient to explain its antiseizure effects. This direct inhibition of excitatory neurotransmission by capric acid in the brain contributes to the anticonvulsant effect of the MCT ketogenic diet. Decanoic acid and the AMPA receptor antagonist drug perampanel act at separate sites on the AMPA receptor, and so it is possible that they have a cooperative effect at the AMPA receptor, suggesting that perampanel and the ketogenic diet could be synergistic.

Capric acid may be responsible for the mitochondrial proliferation associated with the ketogenic diet, and that this may occur via PPARγ receptor agonism and its target genes involved in mitochondrial biogenesis. Complex I activity of the electron transport chain is substantially elevated by decanoic acid treatment.

It should however be noted that orally ingested medium chain fatty acids would be very rapidly degraded by first-pass metabolism by being taken up in the liver via the portal vein, and are quickly metabolized via coenzyme A intermediates through β-oxidation and the citric acid cycle to produce carbon dioxide, acetate and ketone bodies. Whether the ketones, β-hydroxybutyrate, and acetone have direct antiseizure activity is unclear.

== See also ==
- List of saturated fatty acids
- List of carboxylic acids
- Undecylic acid
- Pelargonic acid, a medium-chain fatty acid, also with antiseizure activity
