= Fatty acyl-CoA reductase 1 =

Enzyme found in humans

FAR1

Identifiers
- Aliases: FAR1, MLSTD2, SDR10E1, PFCRD, fatty acyl-CoA reductase 1, CSPSD
- External IDs: OMIM: 616107; MGI: 1914670; GeneCards: FAR1
Enzyme activity
EC #	BRENDA	ExPASy	KEGG	MetaCyc
1.2.1.84	↗	↗	↗	↗

Gene location (Human)
Chr.	Chromosome 11 (human)
Band	11p15.3	Start	13,668,668 bp
Band	11p15.3	End	13,732,346 bp

Gene location (Mouse)
Chr.	Chromosome 7 (mouse)
Band	7|7 F1	Start	113,113,041 bp
Band	7|7 F1	End	113,170,718 bp
RNA expression pattern
Bgee	Human / Mouse (ortholog); Top expressed in: corpus callosum; jejunal mucosa; oral cavity; monocyte; spinal cord; C1 segment; rectum; bone marrow cell; subthalamic nucleus; inferior ganglion of vagus nerve / Top expressed in: epithelium of stomach; pyloric antrum; granulocyte; transitional epithelium of urinary bladder; substantia nigra; mammillary body; proximal tubule; mucous cell of stomach; right kidney; cumulus cell; More reference expression data
BioGPS	n/a
Gene ontology
Molecular function	fatty-acyl-CoA reductase (alcohol-forming) activity; oxidoreductase activity; alcohol-forming fatty acyl-CoA reductase activity
Cellular component	integral component of membrane; peroxisomal membrane; peroxisome; peroxisomal matrix; membrane; integral component of peroxisomal membrane
Biological process	glycerophospholipid biosynthetic process; long-chain fatty-acyl-CoA metabolic process; lipid metabolism; ether lipid biosynthetic process; wax biosynthetic process
Sources:Amigo / QuickGO
Orthologs
Databases	NCBI: entry; OMA: entry
Species	Human	Mouse
Entrez	84188	67420
Ensembl	ENSG00000197601	ENSMUSG00000030759
UniProt	Q8WVX9	Q922J9
RefSeq (mRNA)	NM_032228	NM_001285831; NM_026143; NM_027379; NM_001360668; NM_001360669
RefSeq (protein)	NP_115604	NP_001272760; NP_081655; NP_001347597; NP_001347598
Location (UCSC)	Chr 11: 13.67 – 13.73 Mb	Chr 7: 113.11 – 113.17 Mb
PubMed search
- Wikidata
View/Edit Human	View/Edit Mouse

Fatty acyl-CoA reductase 1 is an enzyme that in humans is encoded by the FAR1 gene. This enzyme produces fatty alcohols from 16 or 18 carbon fatty acyl-CoA and 2 copies of NADPH. These fatty alcohols are needed for the production of ether lipids and wax esters. Unlike its paralog, FAR2, FAR1 is able to not only act on saturated fatty acids, but also unsaturated fatty acids. FAR1 is part of the alcohol-forming fatty acyl-CoA reductase class of enzymes.
