= 1-Hexacosanol =

Primary alcohol with formula C26H54O

Names
- Preferred IUPAC name Hexacosan-1-ol

Identifiers
CAS Number	506-52-5
3D model (JSmol)	Interactive image
Beilstein Reference	1783162
ChEBI	CHEBI:28415
ChemSpider	61478
ECHA InfoCard	100.007.314
EC Number	208-044-4
KEGG	C08381
MeSH	1-hexacosanol
PubChem CID	68171
UNII	M7SD300NNB
CompTox Dashboard (EPA)	DTXSID3027162
- InChI: InChI=1S/C26H54O/c1-2-3-4-5-6-7-8-9-10-11-12-13-14-15-16-17-18-19-20-21-22-23-24-25-26-27/h27H,2-26H2,1H3 Key: IRHTZOCLLONTOC-UHFFFAOYSA-N; InChI=1/C26H54O/c1-2-3-4-5-6-7-8-9-10-11-12-13-14-15-16-17-18-19-20-21-22-23-24-25-26-27/h27H,2-26H2,1H3 Key: IRHTZOCLLONTOC-UHFFFAOYAD
- SMILES: OCCCCCCCCCCCCCCCCCCCCCCCCCC

Properties
Chemical formula	C_{26}H_{54}O
Molar mass	382.717 g·mol^{−1}
Melting point	79 to 81 °C (174 to 178 °F; 352 to 354 K)
Boiling point	240 °C (464 °F; 513 K)
- Except where otherwise noted, data are given for materials in their standard state (at 25 °C [77 °F], 100 kPa). verify (what is ?) Infobox references

1-Hexacosanol /ˌhɛksɪˈkɒsɪnɒl/, also known as ceryl alcohol, is a saturated primary fatty alcohol with a carbon chain length of 26 that is a white waxy solid at room temperature. It is freely soluble in chloroform and insoluble in water. It occurs naturally in the epicuticular wax and plant cuticle of many plant species.
