= 2,2,4,4-Tetramethyl-3-t-butyl-pentane-3-ol =

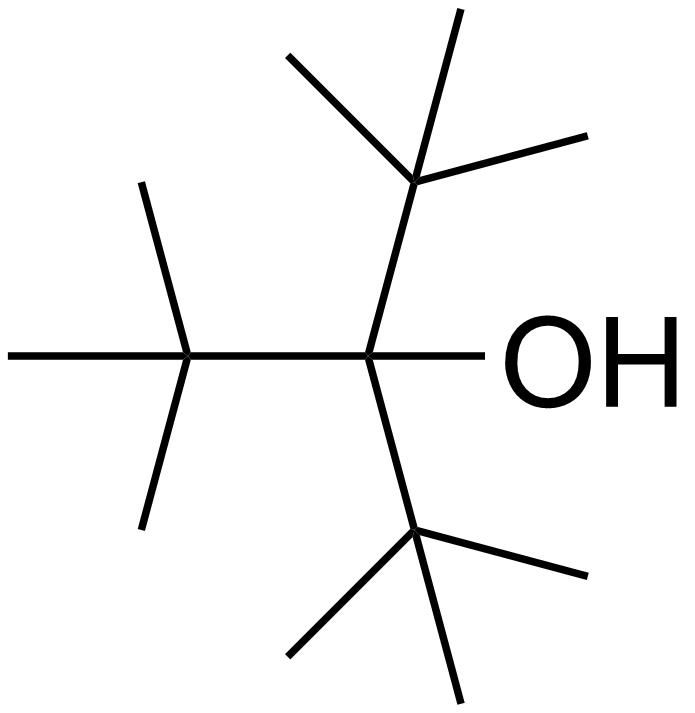

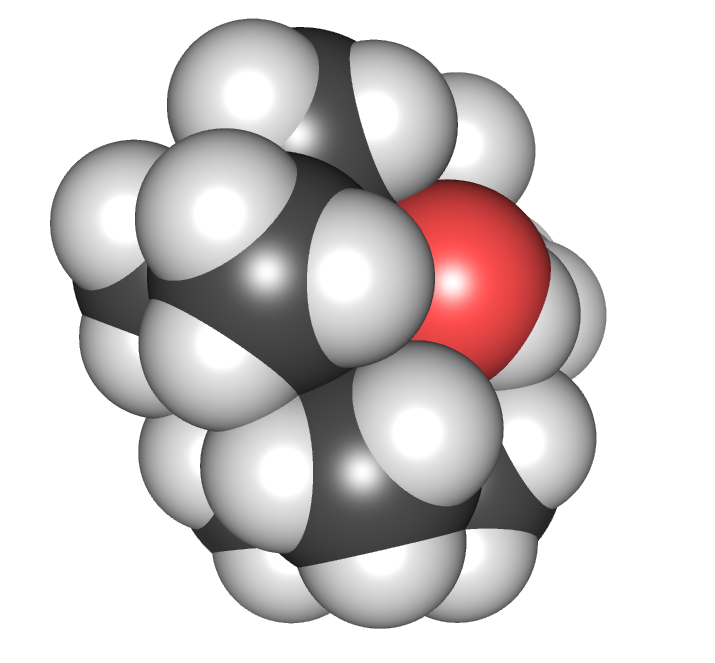

Names
- Preferred IUPAC name 3-tert-Butyl-2,2,4,4-tetramethylpentan-3-ol

Identifiers
CAS Number	41902-42-5
3D model (JSmol)	Interactive image
ChemSpider	125760
PubChem CID	142558
UNII	4UH2D93L3U
CompTox Dashboard (EPA)	DTXSID80194673
- InChI: InChI=1S/C13H28O/c1-10(2,3)13(14,11(4,5)6)12(7,8)9/h14H,1-9H3 Key: LIUBOLYWYDGCSJ-UHFFFAOYSA-N; InChI=1/C13H28O/c1-10(2,3)13(14,11(4,5)6)12(7,8)9/h14H,1-9H3 Key: LIUBOLYWYDGCSJ-UHFFFAOYAS
- SMILES: OC(C(C)(C)C)(C(C)(C)C)C(C)(C)C

Properties
Chemical formula	C_{13}H_{28}O
Molar mass	200.366 g·mol^{−1}
- Except where otherwise noted, data are given for materials in their standard state (at 25 °C [77 °F], 100 kPa). verify (what is ?) Infobox references

2,2,4,4-Tetramethyl-3-t-butyl-pentane-3-ol or tri-tert-butylcarbinol is an organic compound with formula C_{13}H_{28}O, ((H_{3}C)_{3}C)_{3}COH, or ^{t}Bu_{3}COH. It is an alcohol that can be viewed as a structural analog of a tridecane isomer (2,2,4,4-tetramethyl-3-t-butylpentane) where the central hydrogen has been replaced by a hydroxyl group -OH.

Tri-tert-butylcarbinol is arguably the most sterically hindered alcohol that has been prepared to date. In contrast to all other known alcohols, the infrared spectrum of the liquid does not exhibit a broad OH absorption associated with intermolecular hydrogen bonding, making it interesting for research in spectroscopy. The bulky tert-butyl groups (H_{3}C)_{3}C- groups attached to the central carbon prevent the formation of a O–H---O hydrogen bond with another molecule, an intermolecular interaction typical of alcohols.

Another structural analog, in which the COH group is replaced by N, is tri-tert-butylamine, a molecule predicted to be stable but has never been prepared.

Tri-tert-butylcarbinol was first prepared in poor yield using Barbier-type conditions by coupling hexamethylacetone with t-butyl chloride in the presence of sodium sand (5.1 to 8.5% yield), presumably via the organosodium species. Later on, it was shown that under carefully selected conditions, the compound could be prepared in high yield (81%) by addition of tert-butyllithium to hexamethylacetone.
