= Pentadecane =

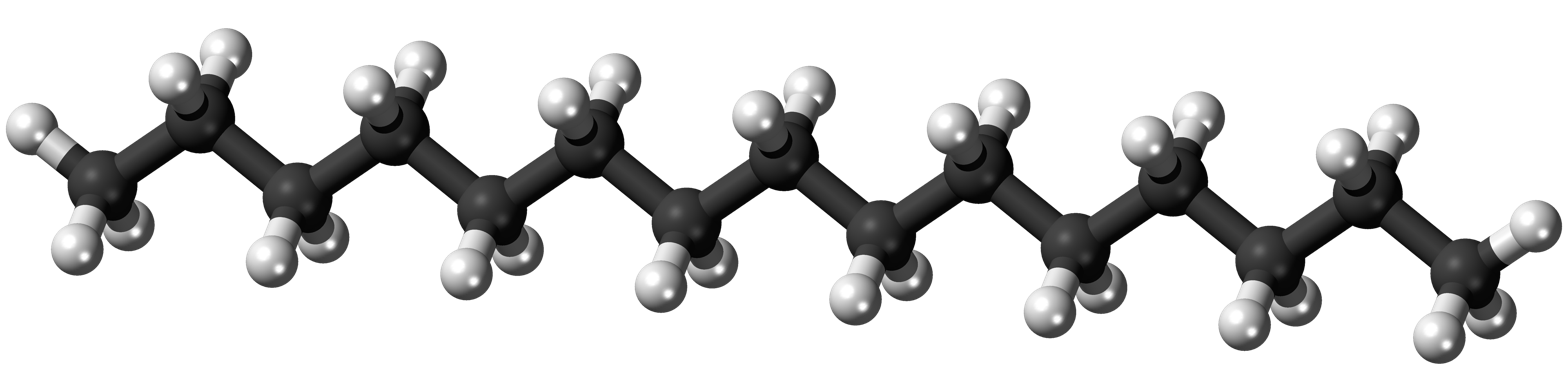

Names
- Preferred IUPAC name Pentadecane
- Other names n-Pentadecane

Identifiers
CAS Number	629-62-9
3D model (JSmol)	Interactive image
Beilstein Reference	1698194
ChEBI	CHEBI:28897
ChemSpider	11885
DrugBank	DB03715
ECHA InfoCard	100.010.090
EC Number	211-098-1
KEGG	C08388
MeSH	pentadecane
PubChem CID	12391
UNII	16H6K2S8M2
CompTox Dashboard (EPA)	DTXSID6027268
- InChI: InChI=1S/C15H32/c1-3-5-7-9-11-13-15-14-12-10-8-6-4-2/h3-15H2,1-2H3 Key: YCOZIPAWZNQLMR-UHFFFAOYSA-N
- SMILES: CCCCCCCCCCCCCCC

Properties
Chemical formula	C_{15}H_{32}
Molar mass	212.421 g·mol^{−1}
Appearance	Colourless liquid
Odor	Oil of D. guineense fruit
Density	769 mg mL^{−1}
Melting point	16.8 to 10.0 °C; 62.1 to 49.9 °F; 289.9 to 283.1 K
Boiling point	270.00 °C; 518.00 °F; 543.15 K
Solubility in water	2.866 μg L^{−1}
log P	7.13
Vapor pressure	356.1 mPa (at 293.83 K)
Henry's law constant (k_{H})	21 nmol Pa^{−1} kg^{−1}
Refractive index (n_{D})	1.431

Thermochemistry
Heat capacity (C)	470.48 J K^{−1} mol^{−1}
Std molar entropy (S^{⦵}_{298})	587.52 J K^{−1} mol^{−1}
Std enthalpy of formation (Δ_{f}H^{⦵}_{298})	−430.2–−426.2 kJ mol^{−1}
Std enthalpy of combustion (Δ_{c}H^{⦵}_{298})	−10.0491–−10.0455 MJ mol^{−1}

Hazards
NFPA 704 (fire diamond)	1 1 0
Flash point	132.00 °C (269.60 °F; 405.15 K)

Related compounds
Related alkanes	Tetradecane; Hexadecane
- Except where otherwise noted, data are given for materials in their standard state (at 25 °C [77 °F], 100 kPa). Infobox references

Pentadecane is an alkane hydrocarbon with the chemical formula C_{15}H_{32}. It can be monoterminally oxidized to 1-pentadecanol.
