= 1-Decanol =

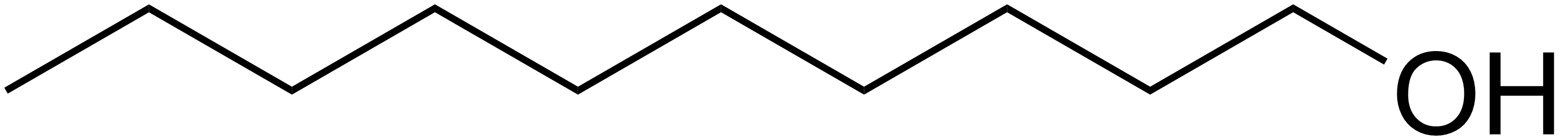
- Skeletal formula

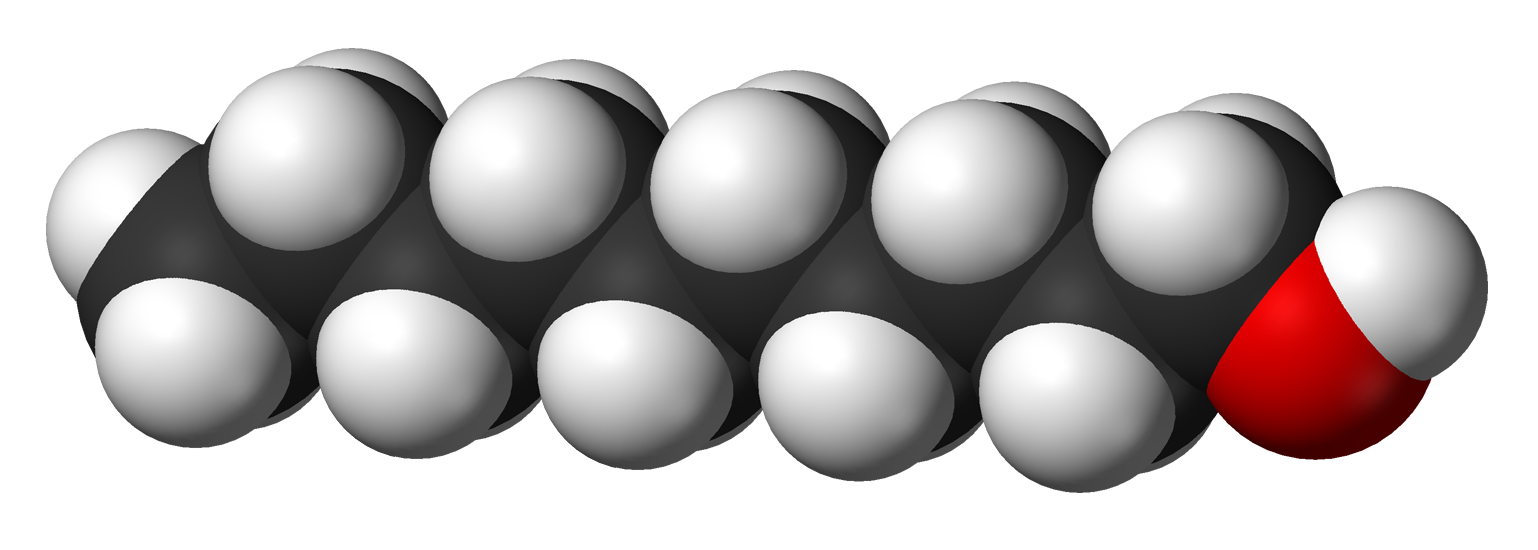
- Space-filling model

Names
- Preferred IUPAC name Decan-1-ol
- Other names decyl alcohol n-decyl alcohol capric alcohol epal 10 antak agent 504

Identifiers
CAS Number	112-30-1
3D model (JSmol)	Interactive image
Abbreviations	DeO n-DeOH nDeOH^{n}DeOH
ChEBI	CHEBI:28903
ChEMBL	ChEMBL25363
ChemSpider	7882
ECHA InfoCard	100.003.597
KEGG	C01633
PubChem CID	8174
UNII	89V4LX791F
CompTox Dashboard (EPA)	DTXSID7021946
- InChI: InChI=1S/C10H21OH/c1-2-3-4-5-6-7-8-9-10-11/h11H,2-10H2,1H3 Key: MWKFXSUHUHTGQN-UHFFFAOYSA-N; InChI=1/C10H21OH/c1-2-3-4-5-6-7-8-9-10-11/h11H,2-10H2,1H3 Key: MWKFXSUHUHTGQN-UHFFFAOYAN
- SMILES: OCCCCCCCCCC

Properties
Chemical formula	C_{10}H_{22}O
Molar mass	158.285 g·mol^{−1}
Appearance	Viscous liquid
Density	0.8297 g/cm^{3}
Melting point	6.4 °C (43.5 °F; 279.5 K)
Boiling point	232.9 °C (451.2 °F; 506.0 K)
Solubility in water	37 mg/L at 25°C
log P	4.57
Viscosity	12.048 mPa.s (@ 25 °C)

Hazards
- GHS labelling
Pictograms	(GHS07: Exclamation mark) (GHS09: Environmental hazard)
Signal word	Warning
Hazard statements	H315, H319, H411, H412
Precautionary statements	P264, P264+P265, P273, P280, P302+P352, P305+P351+P338, P321, P332+P317, P337+P317, P362+P364, P391, P501
NFPA 704 (fire diamond)	2 2 0
Flash point	108 °C (226 °F; 381 K)
Safety data sheet (SDS)	Oxford MSDS
- Except where otherwise noted, data are given for materials in their standard state (at 25 °C [77 °F], 100 kPa). verify (what is ?) Infobox references

1-Decanol is a straight chain fatty alcohol with ten carbon atoms and the molecular formula C_{10}H_{22}O or CH_{3}(CH_{2})_{9}OH. It is a colorless to light yellow viscous liquid that is insoluble in water and has an aromatic odor. The interfacial tension against water at 20 °C is 8.97 mN/m.

== Production ==
Decanol can be prepared by the hydrogenation of decanoic acid, which occurs in modest quantities in coconut oil (about 10%) and palm kernel oil (about 4%). It may also be produced synthetically via the Ziegler process.

== Uses ==
Decanol is used in the manufacture of plasticizers, lubricants, surfactants and solvents. Its ability to permeate the skin has led to it being investigated as a penetration enhancer for transdermal drug delivery.

== Safety ==
Like other medium chain fatty alcohols, 1-decanol is able to permeate the skin which can lead to irritation.
