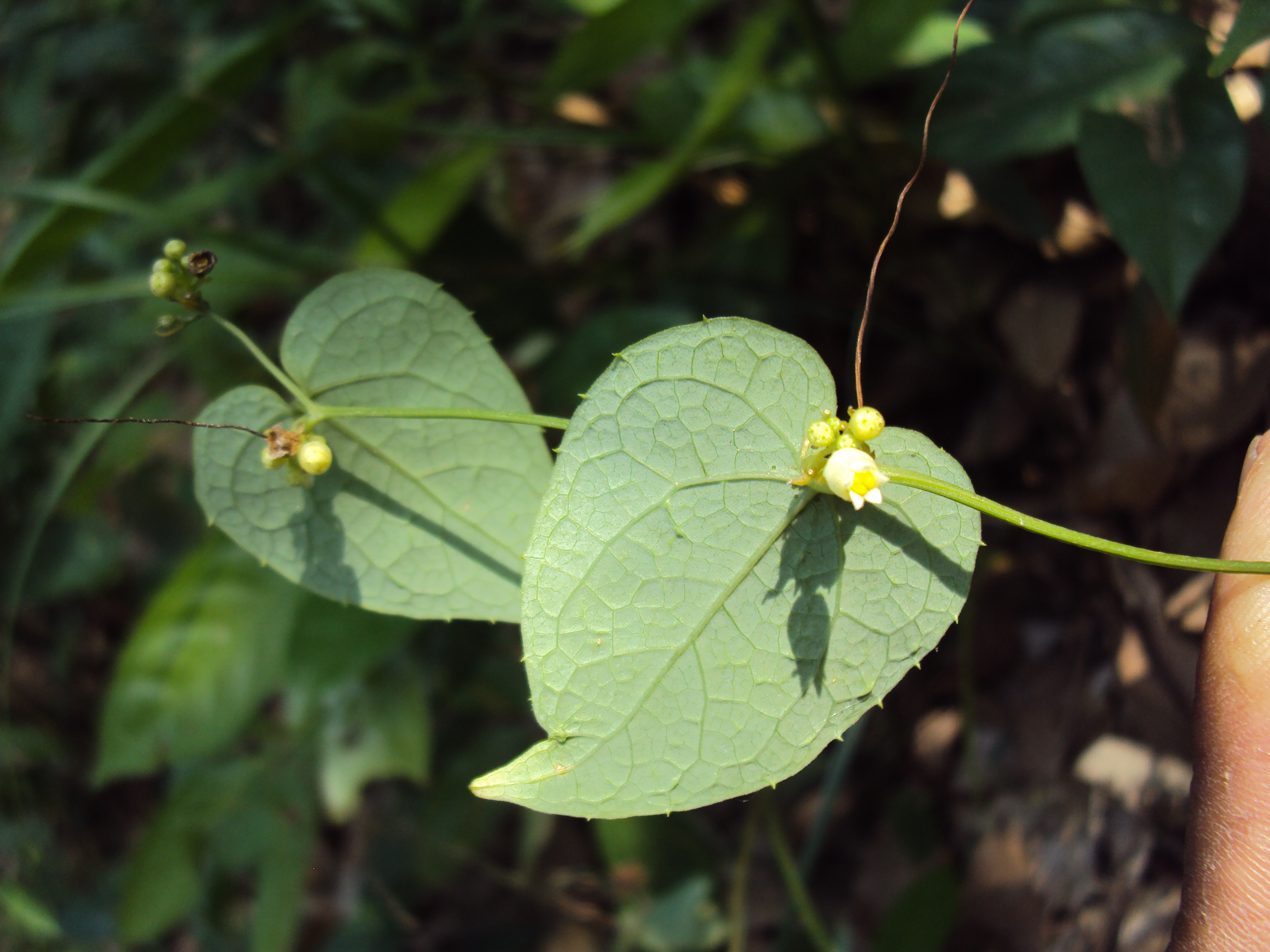
- Solena amplexicaulis

Scientific classification
- Kingdom: Plantae
- Clade: Embryophytes
- Clade: Tracheophytes
- Clade: Angiosperms
- Clade: Eudicots
- Clade: Rosids
- Order: Cucurbitales
- Family: Cucurbitaceae
- Genus: Solena; Lour.

Synonyms
- Juchia M.Roem.; Karivia Arn.

= Solena (plant) =

Genus of plants

Solena is a genus of flowering plants belonging to the family Cucurbitaceae. Its native range is Afghanistan to Southern China and Western Malesia.

== Species ==
Species:

- Solena amplexicaulis (Lam.) Gandhi
- Solena delavayi (Cogn.) C.Y.Wu
- Solena heterophylla Lour.
- Solena umbellata (J.G.Klein ex Willd.) W.J.de Wilde & Duyfjes
