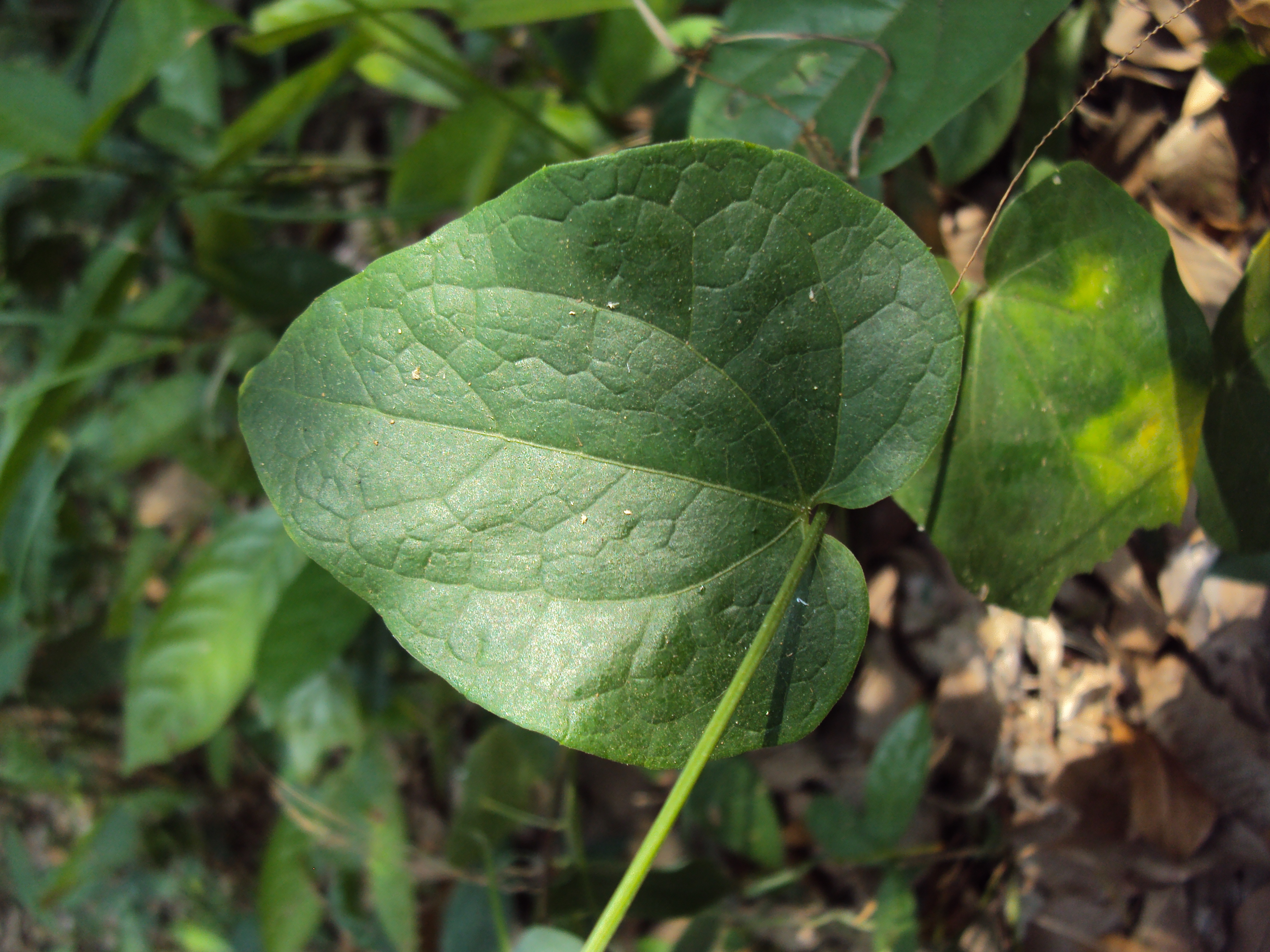

Scientific classification
- Kingdom: Plantae
- Clade: Tracheophytes
- Clade: Angiosperms
- Clade: Eudicots
- Clade: Rosids
- Order: Cucurbitales
- Family: Cucurbitaceae
- Genus: Solena
- Species: S. amplexicaulis

Binomial name
- Solena amplexicaulis (Lam.) Gandhi

Synonyms
- Bryonia amplexicaulis Lam.; Bryonia heterophylla Raeusch.; Bryonia solena Mirb. ex Steud.; Cucurbita sagittata Klein ex Steud.; Harlandia bryonioides Hance; Juchia hastata M.Roem.; Karivia amplexicaulis (Lam.) Arn.; Karivia sinuosa M.Roem.; Melothria amplexicaulis (Lam.) Cogn.; Momordica heterophylla Cogn. ex F.B.Forbes & Hemsl.; Momordica tubulosa Buch.-Ham. ex Naudin; Zehneria filiformis Miq.

= Solena amplexicaulis =

Species of flowering plant

Solena amplexicaulis, commonly known as the creeping cucumber, is a species of plant in the family Cucurbitaceae, native to tropical southern Asia. The fruits, leaves, roots and shoots have use as food and in traditional medicine.

== Description ==
Solena amplexicaulis is a perennial climbing plant with thick, tuberous roots. The branched stem is hairless and bears slender curling tendrils and alternate leaves with slender stalks up to 1 cm (0.4 in) long. The leaf blades are leathery, ovate to oblong with heart-shaped bases and pointed tips. They are up to 12 cm (5 in) long and 5 cm (2 in) wide, with entire or bluntly-toothed margins and either bristly or smooth upper and lower surfaces. Plants are dioecious, with male and female flowers appearing on separate plants. The flowers are borne in the leaf axils; the male flowers are small and grow in short-stalked umbels of ten to twenty flowers, each with a tubular calyx from which the triangular petal tips protrude. They are creamy yellow. The female flowers are rather larger and usually solitary, with three stigmas and ovoid inferior ovaries. The fruits grow up to 5 cm (2 in) long and turn reddish-brown as they ripen. The seeds are greyish-white and obovate or round.

== Distribution and habitat ==
Solena amplexicaulis is found in Sri Lanka, Pakistan, India, Nepal, Bangladesh, Myanmar, Indonesia, Vietnam and China at altitudes of up to 2,600 m (8,500 ft). It grows in a range of habitats including tropical mixed forests, thickets, hilly areas, semi-cultivated areas and roadside verges.

== Uses ==
In India, the fruits of Solena amplexicaulis are picked when not yet ripe for use in salads and in curries, and the shoots, leaves and tubers are also eaten in some parts of the country. In Chhattisgarh, the fruits and roots are consumed to assist in the digestion of bushmeat. Creeping cucumber can be gathered from the wild or can be cultivated as a field crop and given suitable supports over which to climb.

In traditional medicine, the tuberous roots of Solena amplexicaulis are used to treat anorexia, digestive problems, flatulence, asthma, gonorrhoea and spermatorrhoea, and extracts of the leaves are widely used to treat inflammation. Additionally, an ethanol extract of the tuberous roots demonstrates antioxidant, antimicrobial and analgesic properties, but is moderately toxic.

== Gallery ==
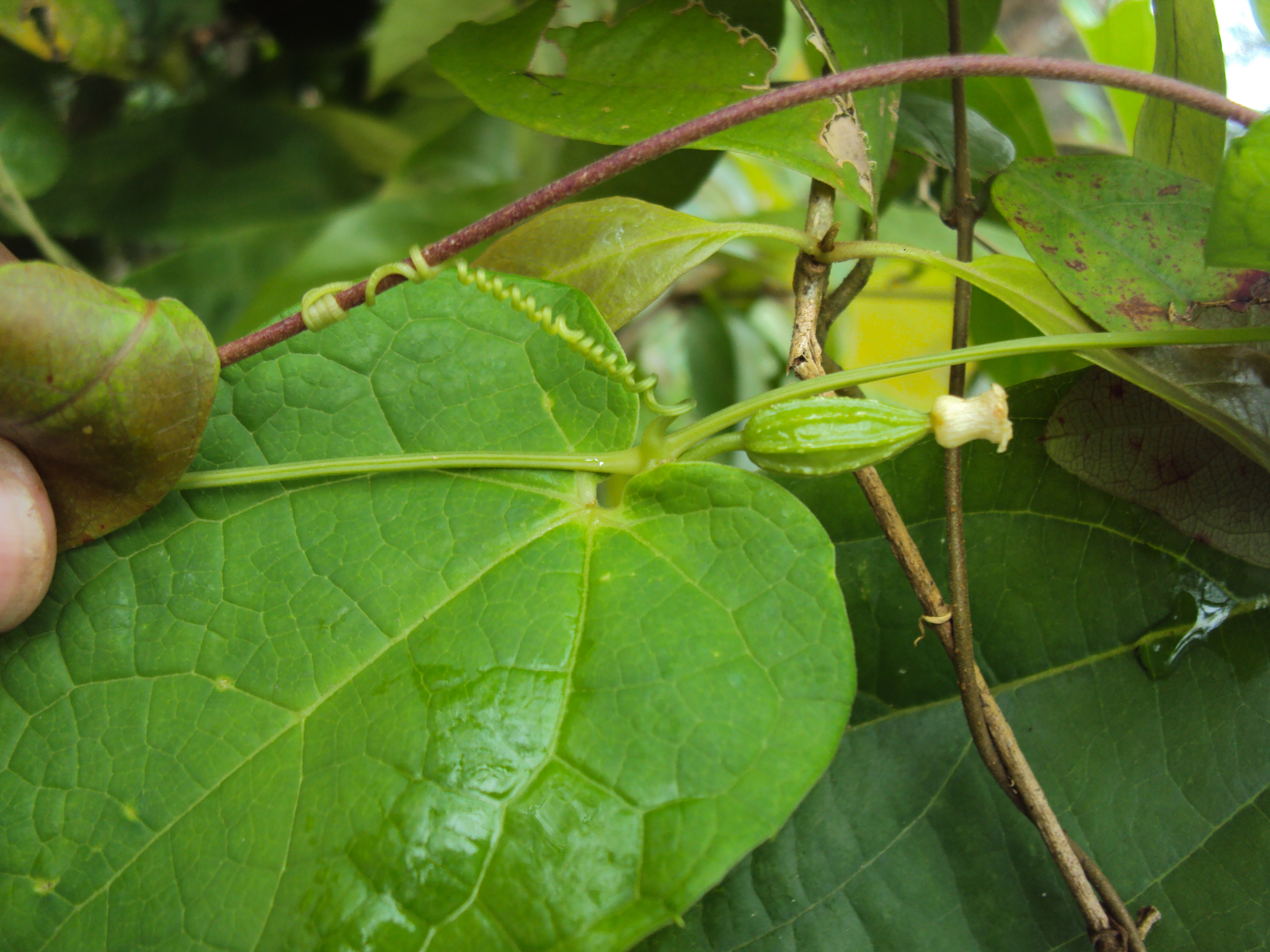

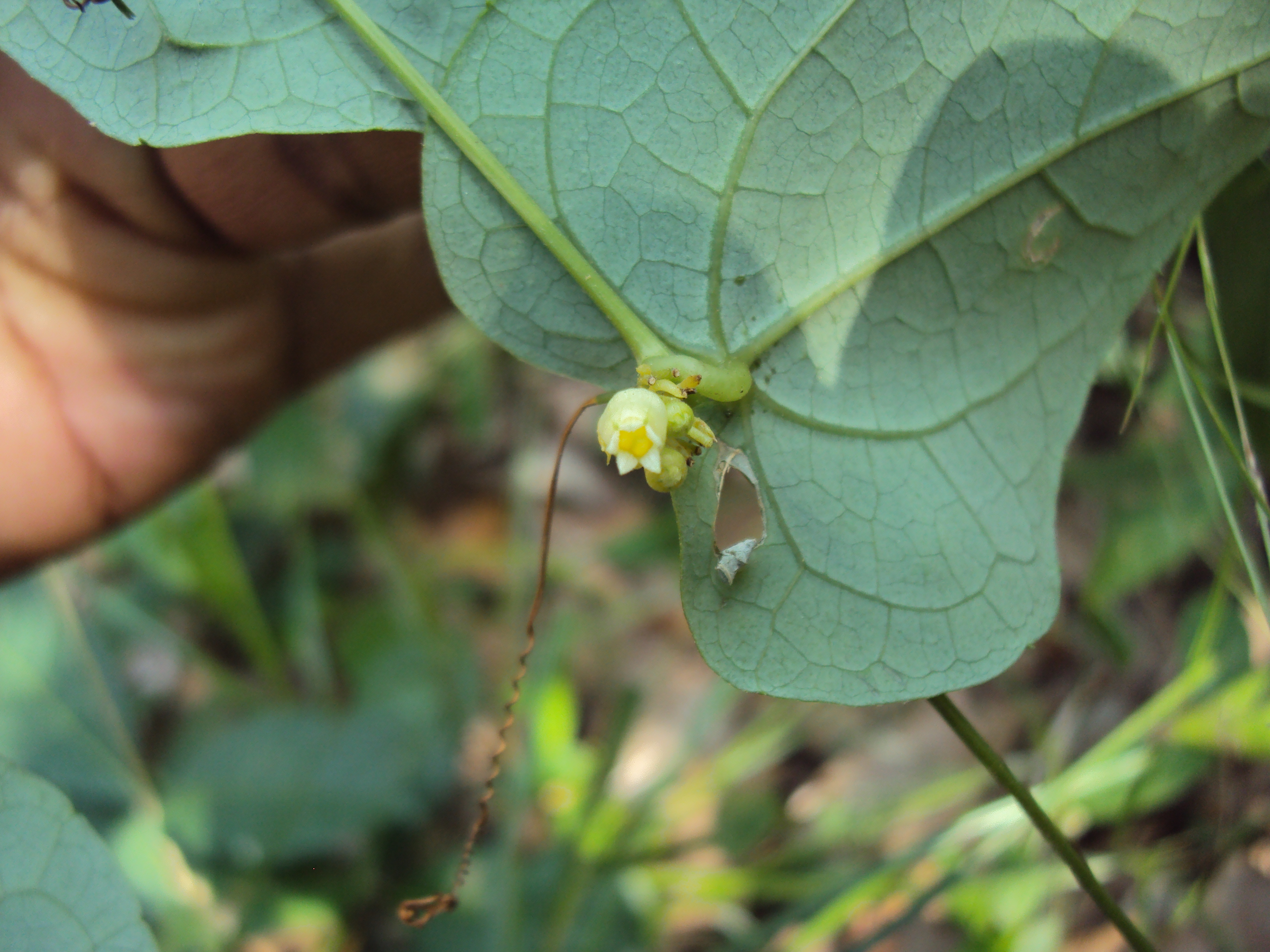

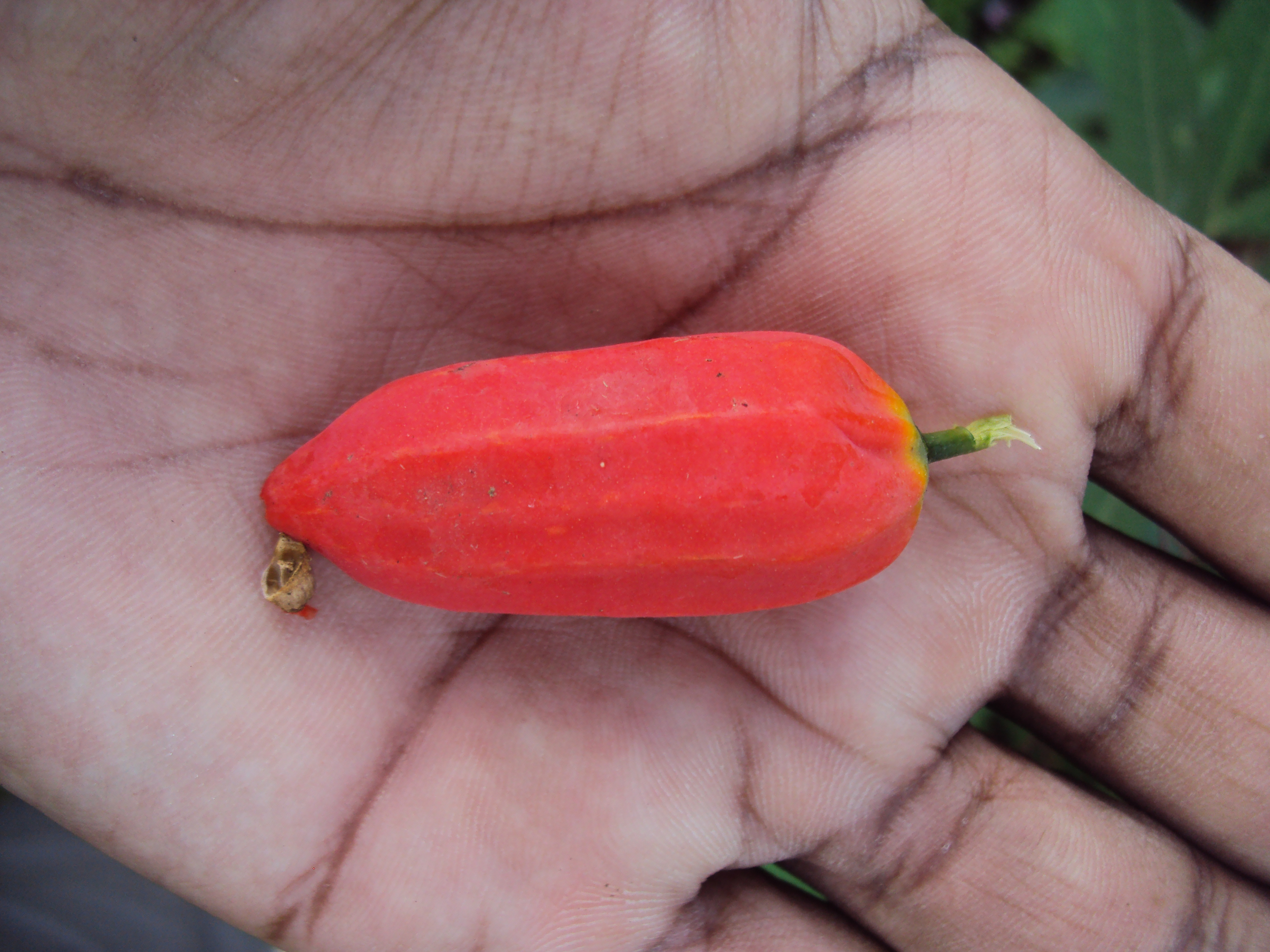

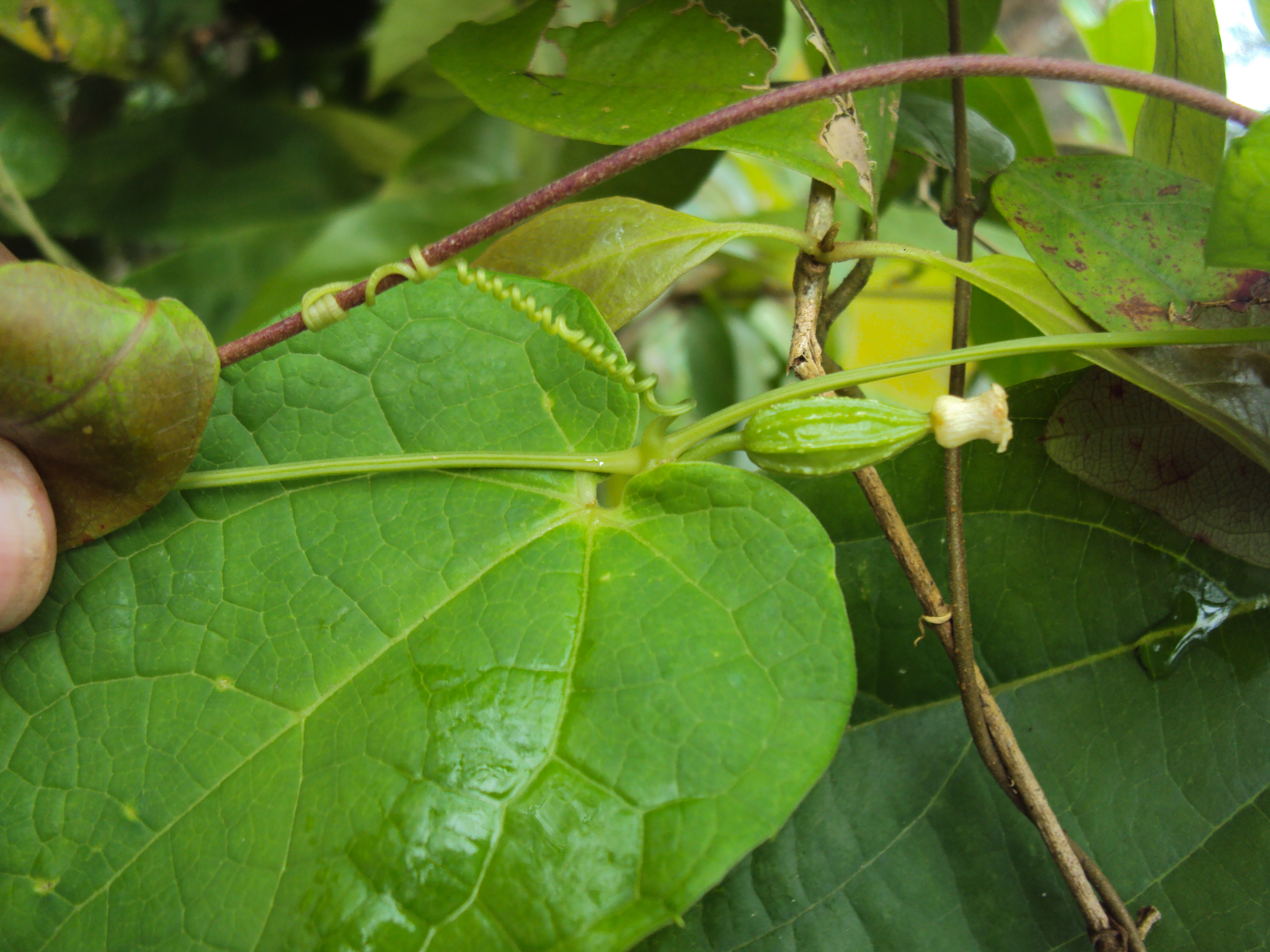

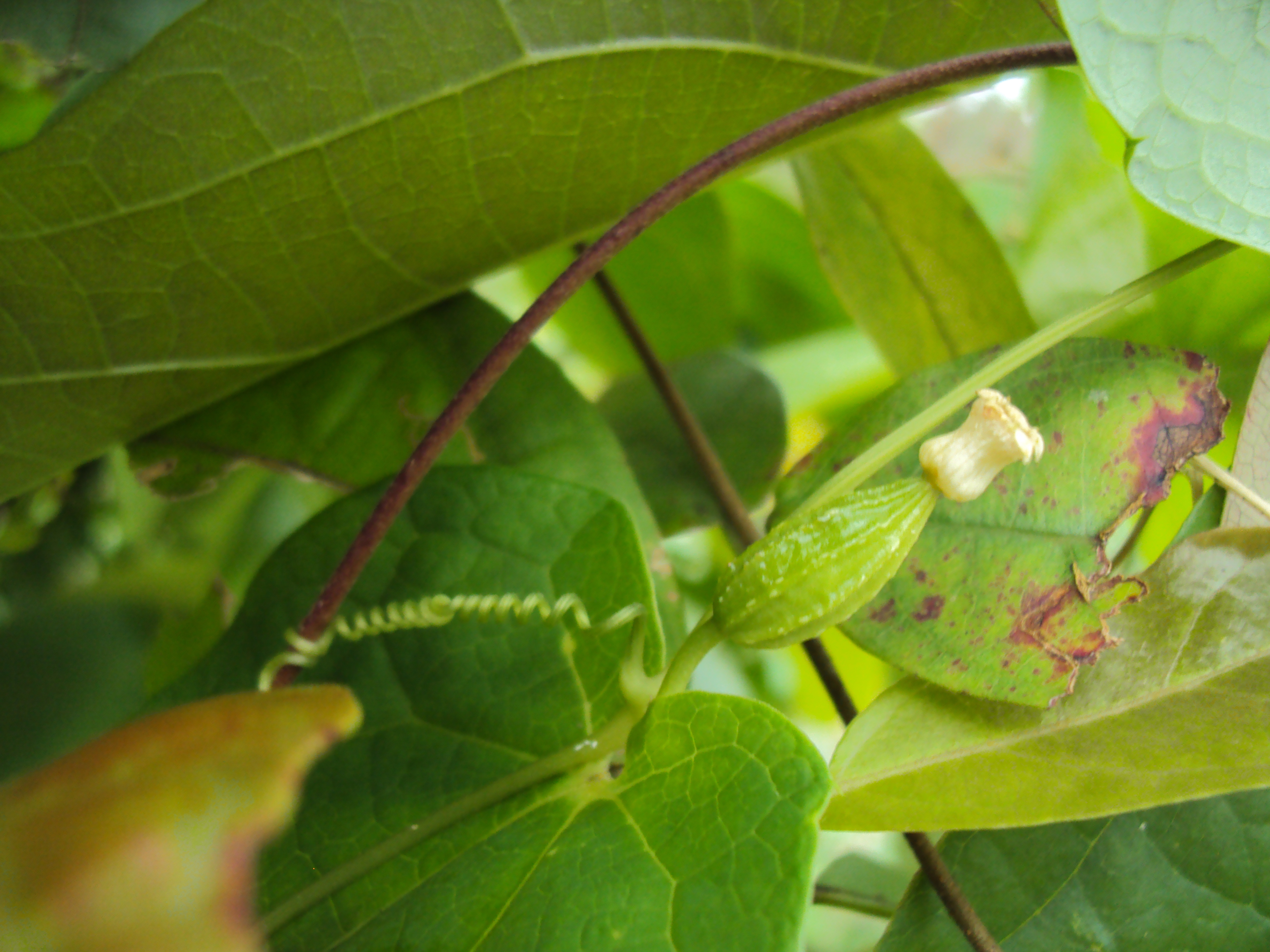
