= Undecanol =

- Skeletal formula

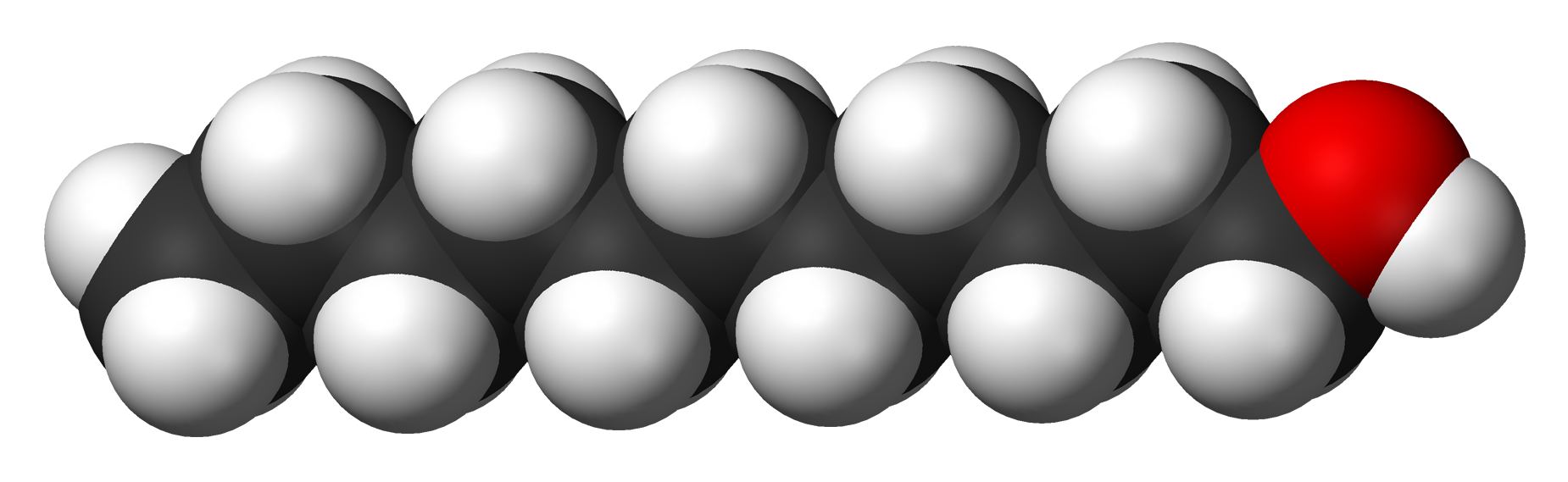
- Space-filling formula

Names
- Preferred IUPAC name Undecan-1-ol
- Other names Undecanol, 1-Undecanol, Undecyl alcohol, 1-Hendecanol

Identifiers
CAS Number	112-42-5
3D model (JSmol)	Interactive image
Abbreviations	UnOH n-UnOH nUnOH^{n}UnOH
ChEBI	CHEBI:87499
ChEMBL	ChEMBL444525
ChemSpider	7892
ECHA InfoCard	100.003.609
PubChem CID	8184
UNII	06MJ0P28T3
CompTox Dashboard (EPA)	DTXSID0026915
- InChI: InChI=1S/C11H24O/c1-2-3-4-5-6-7-8-9-10-11-12/h12H,2-11H2,1H3 Key: KJIOQYGWTQBHNH-UHFFFAOYSA-N
- SMILES: OCCCCCCCCCCC

Properties
Chemical formula	C_{11}H_{24}O
Molar mass	172.312 g·mol^{−1}
Appearance	Colorless liquid
Density	0.8298 g/mL
Melting point	19 °C (66 °F; 292 K)
Boiling point	243 °C (469 °F; 516 K)
Solubility in water	Insoluble
Solubility in Ethanol and diethyl ether	Soluble

Hazards
- GHS labelling
Pictograms	(GHS07: Exclamation mark) (GHS09: Environmental hazard)
Signal word	Warning
Hazard statements	H315, H319, H400, H411
Precautionary statements	P264, P264+P265, P273, P280, P302+P352, P305+P351+P338, P321, P332+P317, P337+P317, P362+P364, P391, P501
NFPA 704 (fire diamond)	1 1 0
Flash point	108 to 113 °C (226 to 235 °F; 381 to 386 K)
Autoignition temperature	253 °C (487 °F; 526 K)
- Except where otherwise noted, data are given for materials in their standard state (at 25 °C [77 °F], 100 kPa). verify (what is ?) Infobox references

Undecanol, also known by its IUPAC name 1-undecanol or undecan-1-ol, and by its trivial names undecyl alcohol and hendecanol, is a fatty alcohol. Undecanol is a colorless, water-insoluble liquid of melting point 19 °C and boiling point 243 °C.

== Industrial uses and production ==
It has a floral citrus like odor, and a fatty taste and is used as a flavoring ingredient in foods. It is commonly produced by the reduction of undecanal, the analogous aldehyde.

== Natural occurrence ==
1-Undecanol is found naturally in many foods such as fruits (including apples and bananas), butter, eggs and cooked pork.

== Toxicity ==
Undecanol can irritate the skin, eyes and lungs. Ingestion can be harmful, with the approximate toxicity of ethanol.
