= Arachidyl alcohol =

- Skeletal formula of arachidyl alcohol

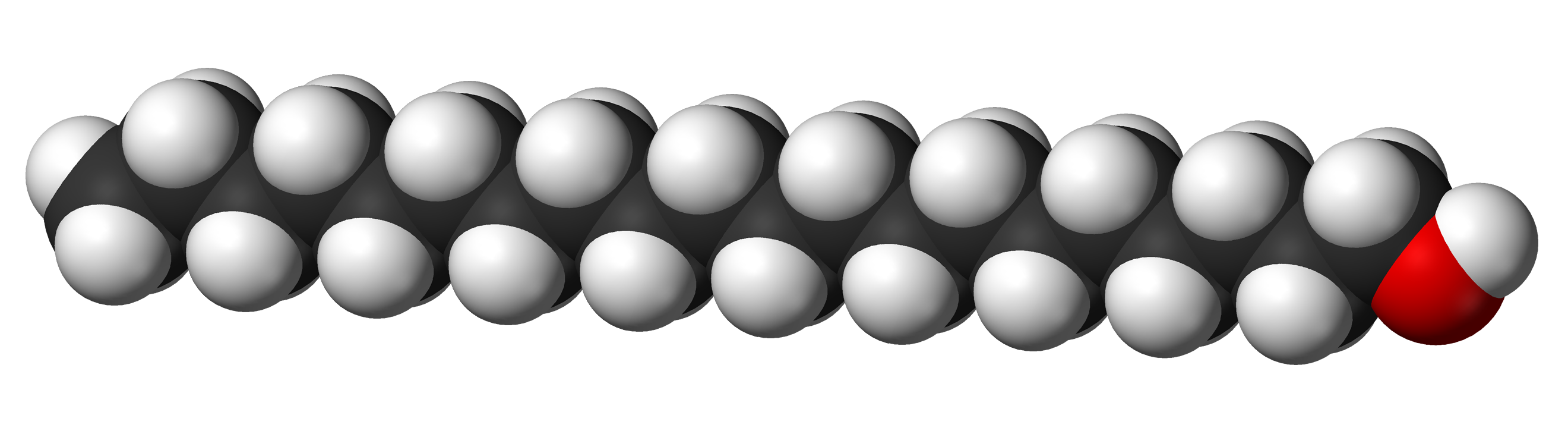
- Spacefill model of arachidyl alcohol

Names
- Preferred IUPAC name Icosan-1-ol
- Other names Arachidalcohol Arachidic alcohol Hydroxyicosane; Icosalcohol; Icosanol; 1-Icosanol n-Icosanol; Icosyl alcohol Icosyl hydrate Icosylic alcohol Nonadecylcarbinol 1-Eicosanol

Identifiers
CAS Number	629-96-9
3D model (JSmol)	Interactive image; Interactive image
Beilstein Reference	1705104
ChEBI	CHEBI:75627
ChEMBL	ChEMBL451717
ChemSpider	11898
ECHA InfoCard	100.010.110
EC Number	211-119-4
PubChem CID	12404
UNII	1QR1QRA9BU
CompTox Dashboard (EPA)	DTXSID0027272
- InChI: InChI=1S/C20H42O/c1-2-3-4-5-6-7-8-9-10-11-12-13-14-15-16-17-18-19-20-21/h21H,2-20H2,1H3 Key: BTFJIXJJCSYFAL-UHFFFAOYSA-N; InChI=1/C20H42O/c1-2-3-4-5-6-7-8-9-10-11-12-13-14-15-16-17-18-19-20-21/h21H,2-20H2,1H3 Key: BTFJIXJJCSYFAL-UHFFFAOYAC
- SMILES: CCCCCCCCCCCCCCCCCCCCO; OCCCCCCCCCCCCCCCCCCCC

Properties
Chemical formula	C_{20}H_{42}O
Molar mass	298.555 g·mol^{−1}
Appearance	White, translucent crystals
Melting point	64 °C (147 °F; 337 K)
Boiling point	372 °C (702 °F; 645 K)
Solubility in water	1.51 × 10^{−6} g dm^{−3}
log P	8.99
Vapor pressure	<0.01 kPa (at 20 °C)

Hazards
- GHS labelling
Pictograms	(GHS07: Exclamation mark)
Signal word	Warning
Hazard statements	H319
Precautionary statements	P264+P265, P280, P305+P351+P338, P337+P317
Flash point	195 °C (383 °F; 468 K)
- Except where otherwise noted, data are given for materials in their standard state (at 25 °C [77 °F], 100 kPa). verify (what is ?) Infobox references

Arachidyl alcohol (icosan-1-ol), is a waxy substance used as an emollient in cosmetics. It is a straight-chain fatty alcohol with 20 carbon atoms, typically obtained via the hydrogenation of arachidic acid or arachidonic acid, both of which are present in peanut oil. Its name is derived from that of the peanut plant (Latin: arachis).
