= Ziegler process =

In organic chemistry, the Ziegler process (also called the Ziegler-Alfol synthesis) is a method for producing fatty alcohols from ethylene using an organoaluminium compound. The reaction produces linear primary alcohols with an even numbered carbon chain. The process uses an aluminum compound to oligomerize ethylene and allow the resulting alkyl group to be oxygenated. The usually targeted products are fatty alcohols, which are otherwise derived from natural fats and oils. Fatty alcohols are used in food and chemical processing. They are useful due to their amphipathic nature. The synthesis route is named after Karl Ziegler, who described the process in 1955.

== Process details ==
The Ziegler alcohol synthesis involves oligomerization of ethylene using triethylaluminium followed by oxidation. The triethylaluminium is produced by action of aluminium, ethylene, and hydrogen gas. In the production process, two-thirds of the triethylaluminium produced is recycled back into the reactor, and only one-third is used to produce the fatty alcohols. The recycling step is used to produce triethylaluminium at a higher yield and with less time. Triethylaluminium reacts with ethylene to form higher molecular weight trialkylaluminium. The number of equivalents of ethylene n equals the total number of monomer units being grown on the initial ethylene chains, where (n = x + y + z), and x, y, and z are the number of ethylene units per chain. Trialkylaluminium is oxidized with air to form aluminum alkoxides, and finally hydrolyzed to aluminum hydroxide and the desired alcohols.

1. Al+3ethylene+1.5H_{2} → Al(C_{2}H_{5})_{3}
2. Al(C_{2}H_{5})_{3} n-ethylene → Al((CH_{2}CH_{2})_{n}CH_{2}CH_{3})_{3}
3. Al((CH_{2}CH_{2})_{n}CH_{2}CH_{3})_{3}+ O_{2} → Al(O(CH_{2}CH_{2})_{n}CH_{2}CH_{3})_{3}
4. Al(O(CH_{2}CH_{2})_{n}CH_{2}CH_{3})_{3}+3H_{2}O → Al(OH)_{3} + CH_{3}CH_{2}(CH_{2}CH_{2})_{n}OH

The temperature of the reaction influences the molecular weight of alcohol growth. Temperatures in the range of 60-120°C form higher molecular weight trialkylaluminium while higher temperatures (e.g., 120-150 °C) cause thermal displacement reactions that afford α-olefin chains. Above 150 °C, dimerization of the α-olefins occurs.

== Applications ==
Aluminum hydroxide, the byproduct of the synthesis, can be dehydrated to give aluminium oxide, which, at high purities, has a high commercial value. One modification of the Ziegler process is called the EPAL process. In this process, chain growth is optimized to produce alcohols with narrow molecular weight distribution. Synthesis of other alcohols use Ziegler and the updated EPAL process, such as the transalkylation of styrene to form 2-phenylethanol. Diethylaluminum hydride can be employed in place of triethylaluminium.

== See also ==
- Guerbet reaction, a route for the production of branched fatty alcohols
