= 1-Tridecanol =

- skeletal structure

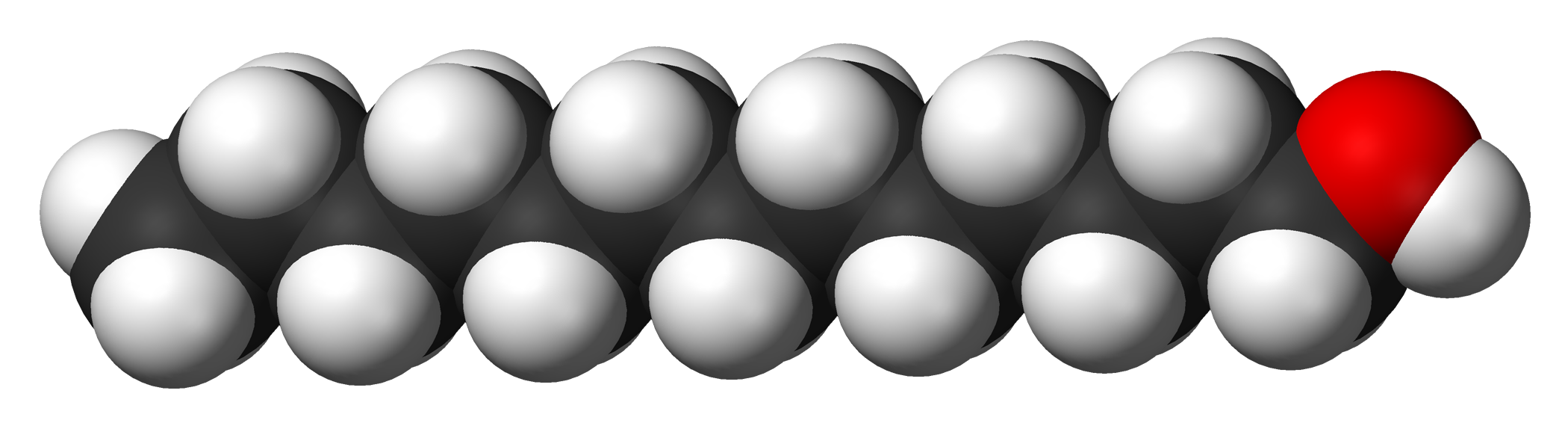

Names
- Preferred IUPAC name Tridecan-1-ol
- Other names 1-Tridecanol; Tridecyl alcohol

Identifiers
CAS Number	112-70-9
3D model (JSmol)	Interactive image
ChEBI	CHEBI:34123
ChEMBL	ChEMBL26215
ChemSpider	7915
ECHA InfoCard	100.003.635
PubChem CID	8207
UNII	8I9428H868
CompTox Dashboard (EPA)	DTXSID2021947
- InChI: InChI=1S/C13H28O/c1-2-3-4-5-6-7-8-9-10-11-12-13/h13H,2-13H2,1H3 Key: needed; InChI=1/C13H28O/c1-2-3-4-5-6-7-8-9-10-11-12-13/h13H,2-13H2,1H3 Key: needed
- SMILES: CCCCCCCCCCCCCO

Properties
Chemical formula	C_{13}H_{28}O
Molar mass	200.366 g·mol^{−1}
Appearance	White solid
Density	0.84 g/cm^{3}
Melting point	32 °C (90 °F; 305 K)
Boiling point	274–280 °C (525–536 °F; 547–553 K)
Solubility in water	Practically insoluble in water

Hazards
- GHS labelling
Pictograms	(GHS05: Corrosive) (GHS07: Exclamation mark) (GHS09: Environmental hazard)
Signal word	Warning
Hazard statements	H315, H319, H400, H411
Precautionary statements	P261, P264, P271, P280, P302+P352, P304+P340+P312, P305+P351+P338, P332+P313, P337+P313, P362, P403+P233, P405, P501
NFPA 704 (fire diamond)	2 1 0
Flash point	120 °C (248 °F; 393 K)
Autoignition temperature	260 °C (500 °F; 533 K)
- Lethal dose or concentration (LD, LC)
LD_{50} (median dose)	17200 mg/kg (rat, oral)
- Except where otherwise noted, data are given for materials in their standard state (at 25 °C [77 °F], 100 kPa). Infobox references

1-Tridecanol (Tridecanol) is an organic compound with the formula C_{13}H_{28}O or CH_{3}(CH_{2})_{12}OH. It is a colorless oily solid that is classified as a primary alcohol.

Like related long chain alcohols, tridecanol is sometimes classified as a fatty alcohol because they were once obtained by hydrogenation of fats. Most fatty alcohols, however, have even numbers of carbons. 1-Tridecanol can be obtained by hydrogenation of tridecanal. 1-Tridecanol is used as a lubricant and for the manufacture of surfactants and plasticizers.
