= Primary alcohol =

Alcohol in which the hydroxy group is bonded to a primary carbon atom

Ethanol

Butanol

A primary alcohol is an alcohol in which the hydroxy group is bonded to a primary carbon atom. It can also be defined as a molecule containing a "–CH_{2}OH" group. In contrast, a secondary alcohol has a formula "–CHROH" and a tertiary alcohol has a formula "–CR_{2}OH", where "R" indicates a carbon-containing group.

Examples of primary alcohols include ethanol, 1-propanol, and 1-butanol.

Methanol is also generally regarded as a primary alcohol, including by the 1911 edition of the Encyclopædia Britannica.

== See also ==
- Alcohol (especially Nomenclature section for discussion on Secondary and Tertiary alcohols.)
- Oxidation of primary alcohols to carboxylic acids
