= Hive tool =

Tool used in beekeeping

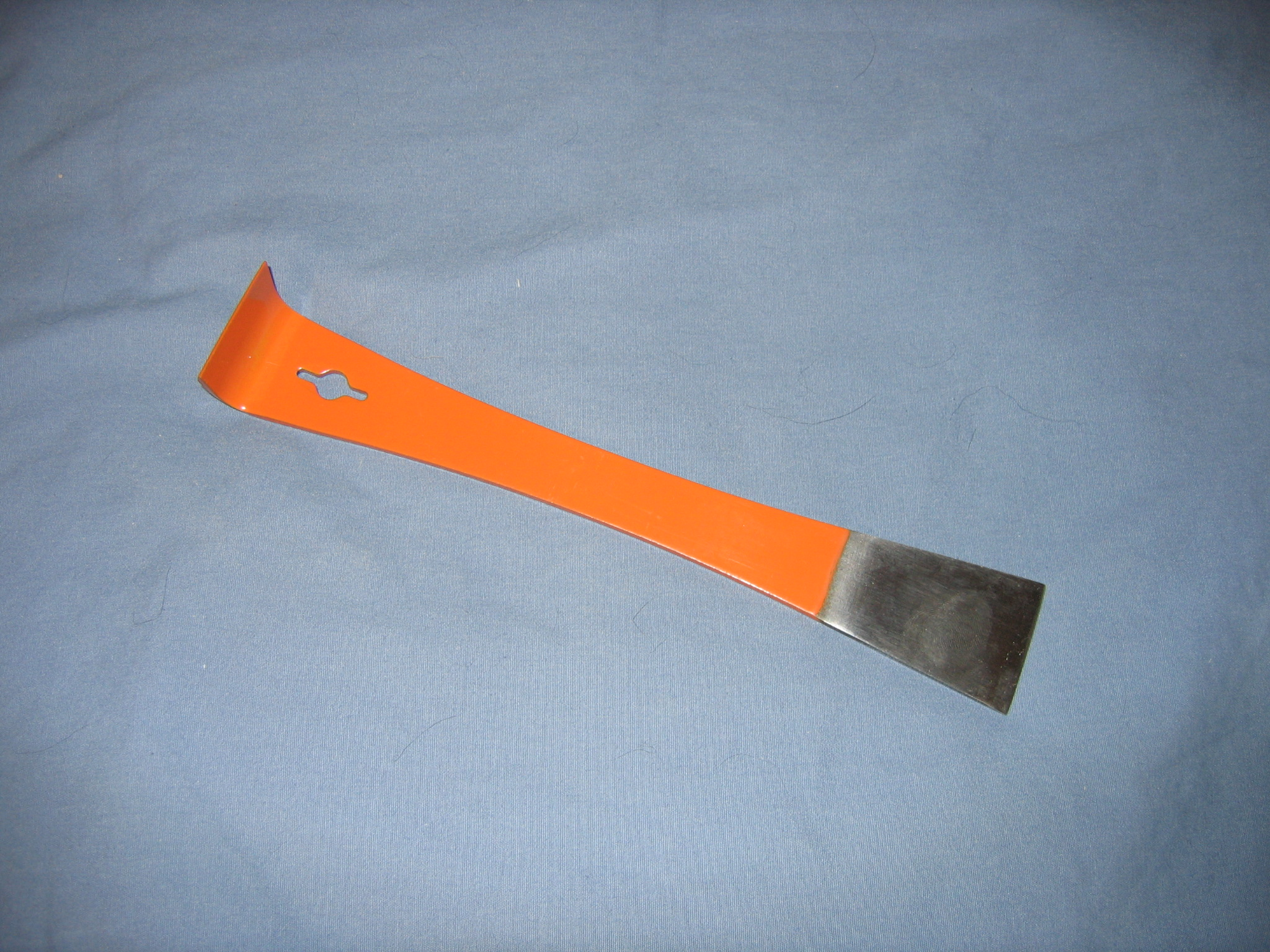
- Standard 10" hive tool
- Classification: Beekeeping
- Types: Standard; J-Hook; Frame Grip
- Used with: Bee smoker
- Inventor: unknown
- Manufacturer: various

A hive tool is a handheld multipurpose tool used in maintaining and inspecting beehives. Hive tools come in multiple variants and styles, and is intended as an all-in-one tool for beekeepers.

The hive tool is the third most essential tool for the beekeeper after the beekeeping veil and bee smoker. There are two types of hive tool in common use – the standard hive tool and J-type hive tool.

The standard hive tool has a box levering edge and a frame levering edge. The J-type hive tool also has a box levering edge, but on the other side is a J-hook and a small notch. Either type may have a small possibly tapered hole which is intended for removing small nails like a claw hammer. The other job of the hive tool is to lift frames when the hive is propolized. A J-type tool should be used in a specific way – the J goes into the bee space and the notch rests on the hive wall or the frame behind to provide lift. It is recommended not to use the J-hook under the lugs of the frames – it will not fit and may break the lugs off the frame.

Using an ordinary chisel or screwdriver instead may result in damage to equipment or to the beehive. Because an ordinary tool may cause excessive damage, it might not be worth the trouble when using these tools to inspect the hive. This is especially true in the case where a beekeeper is using these tools directly to manipulate materials.

== Uses ==
The hive tool is mainly used for two things:

- Prying things apart
- Scraping things off

The beekeeper will use it throughout hive inspections. Here are some uses:

- Prying off the cover of the beehive glued with propolis
- Prying boxes apart stuck together with propolis
- Loosening frames from the hive body
- Removing burr comb, bridge comb or brace comb.
- Scraping off propolis or debris from parts of the hive
- Removing the lid off a bee package
- Dislodging bee stingers from the skin without squeezing the venom sac.

== Variants ==
=== Standard ===
The standard hive tool is made of a piece of plate metal bent at 90°.

=== J-Hook ===
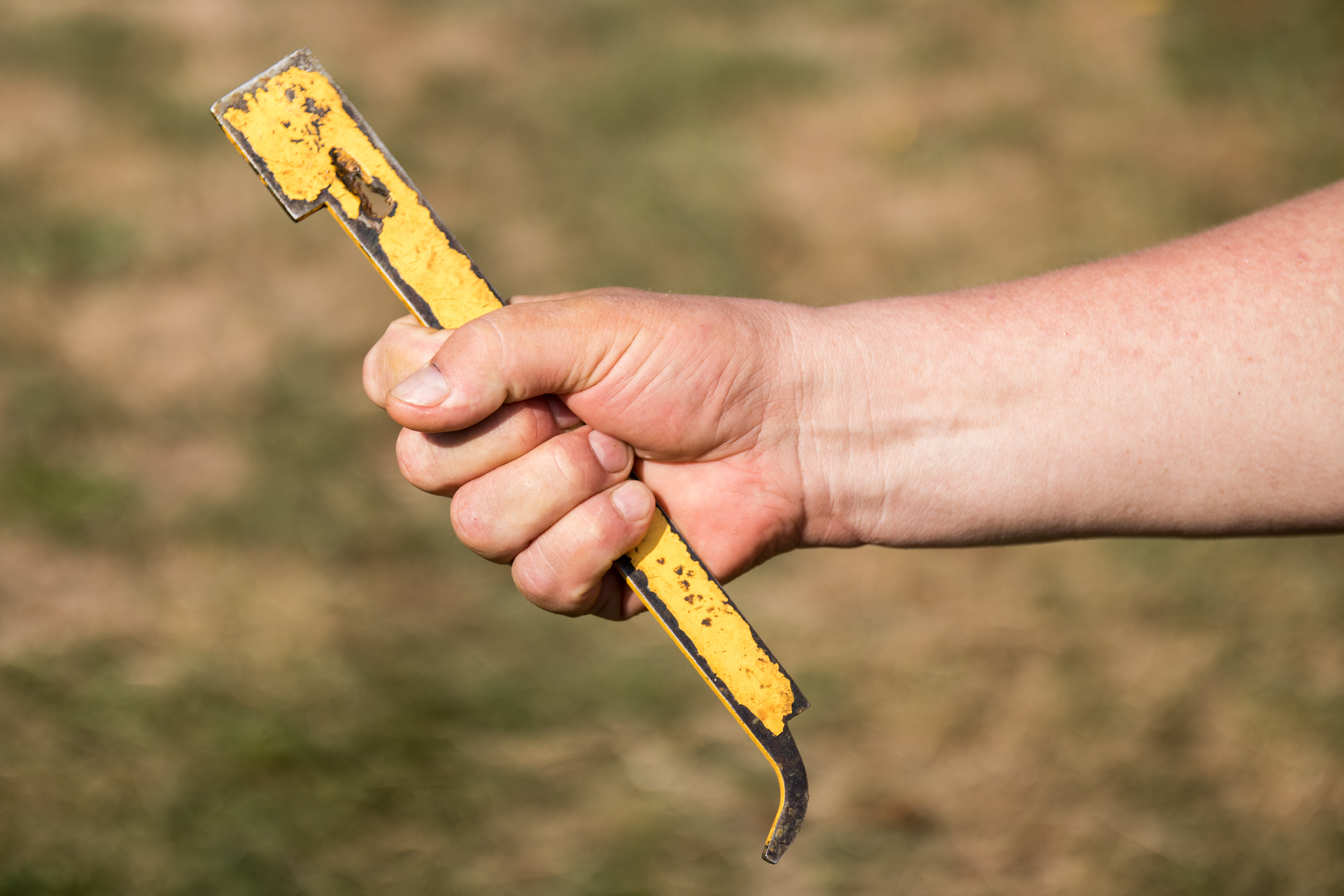
Australian hive tool, a J-hook type

The J-Hook variant describes any type of hive tool that utilizes a curved hook at either end. The hook is in the same plane as the prying part and is thus, normally flat. The hook is used primarily for prying the hive frames loose while reducing potential damage done to both the frame and comb. It is traditionally a flat tool.

=== Frame Grip ===
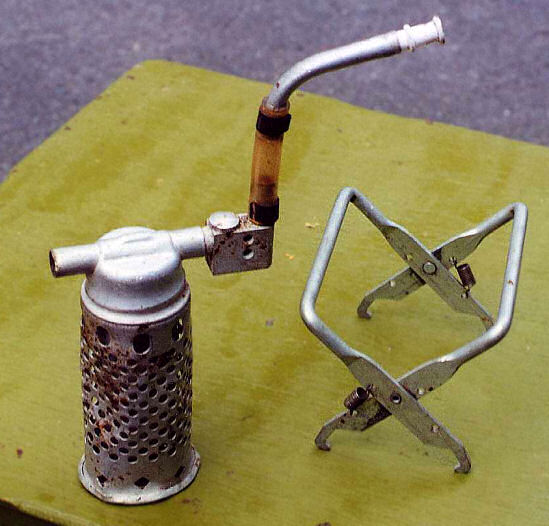
Frame lifter is on right.

Operating very similarly to a pair of pliers, the frame grip can act as an alternative to a J-hook hive tool. Commonly used on more aggressive hives, the frame grip hive tool allows quick and efficient inspection of the hive frames. It can alternatively be used as a nail puller.
