= Beekeeper =

Person who keeps honey bees

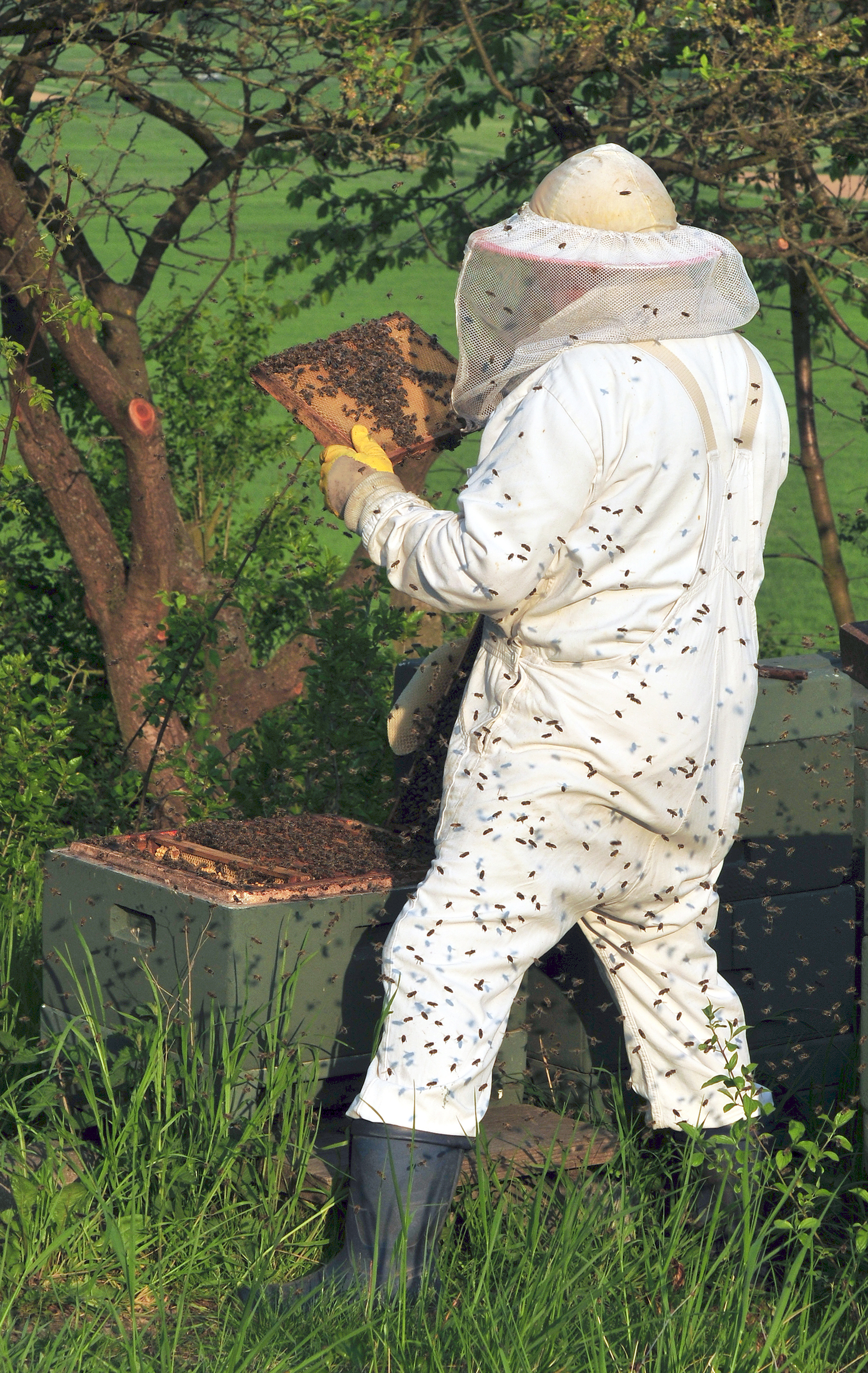
A beekeeper holding a brood frame, in Lower Saxony, Germany

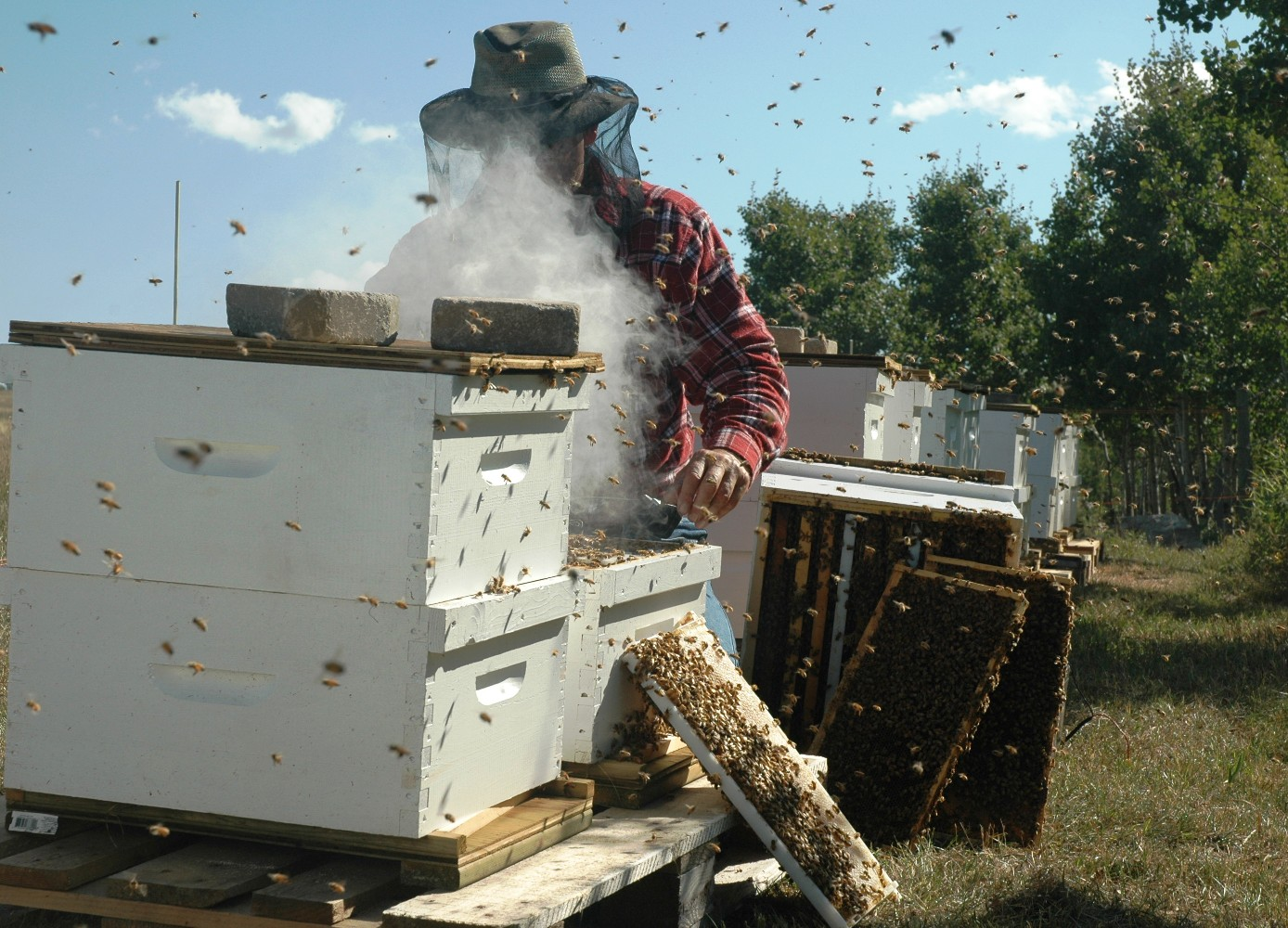
A commercial beekeeper working in an apiary

A beekeeper is a person who keeps honey bees, a profession known as beekeeping. The term beekeeper refers to a person who keeps honey bees in beehives, boxes, or other receptacles. The beekeeper does not control the creatures. The beekeeper owns the hives or boxes and associated equipment. The bees are free to forage or leave (swarm) as they desire. Bees usually return to the beekeeper's hive as it presents a clean, dark, sheltered home.

Beekeepers are also called honey farmers, apiarists, or less commonly, apiculturists (both from the Latin apis, bee; cf. apiary).

== Purposes of beekeeping ==
=== Value of honey bees ===
Honey bees produce commodities such as honey, beeswax, pollen, propolis, and royal jelly. Some beekeepers also raise queens and other bees to sell to various farmers, and to satisfy scientific curiosity. Beekeepers also use honeybees to provide pollination services to fruit and vegetable growers. Many people keep bees as a hobby. Others do it for income either as a sideline to their main work or as a commercial operator. These factors affect the number of colonies maintained by the beekeeper.

=== Commodity ===
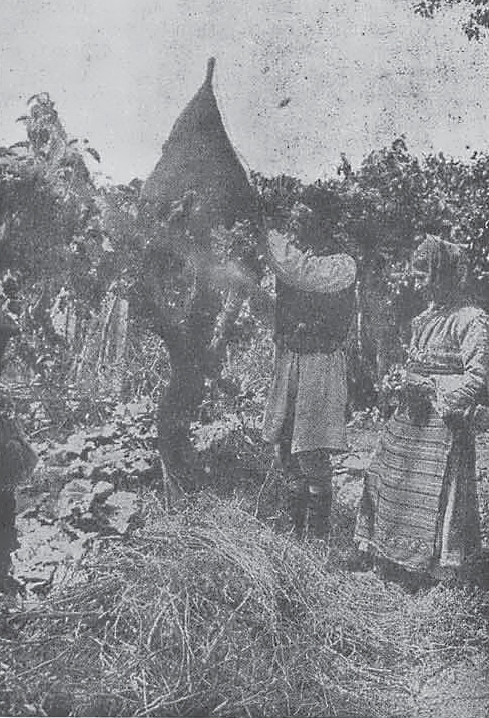
Beekeepers from North Macedonia, from the beginning of 20th century

Beekeepers may produce commodities (farm products) for sale. Honey is the most valuable commodity sold by beekeepers. Honey-producer beekeepers try to maintain minimum-strength colonies of bees in areas with dense nectar sources. They produce and sell liquified honey and sometimes honeycombs. Beekeepers may sell their commodities in retail, as self-brokers, or through commercial packers and distributors. Beeswax, pollen, royal jelly, and propolis may also be significant revenue generators. Taiwanese beekeepers, for example, export tonnes of royal jelly, the high-nutrition food supplement fed to queen honeybees. Modern beekeepers rarely keep honeybees exclusively for beeswax production. Beeswax is harvested along with honey and rectified for sale.

=== Pollination ===
Some beekeepers provide a pollination service to other farmers. These beekeepers might not produce any honey for sale. Pollination beekeepers move vast quantities of honey bee hives at night so fruits and vegetables have enough pollinating insects available for maximum levels of production. In 2016, almonds accounted for 86% of all U.S. expenditures on pollination services. For the service of maintaining strong colonies of bees and moving them into crops such as almonds, apples, cherries, blueberries, melons, and squash, these beekeepers are usually paid a cash fee.

=== Queen breeding ===
Queen breeders are specialist beekeepers who raise queen bees for other beekeepers. The breeders maintain select stock with superior qualities and tend to raise their bees in geographic regions with early springs. These beekeepers may also provide extra bees to beekeepers (honey producers, pollinators, or hobby beekeepers) who want to start new operations or expand their farms. Queen breeders use Jenter kits in order to produce large numbers of queen bees quickly and efficiently.

== Classifications of beekeepers ==
=== Hobby beekeepers ===
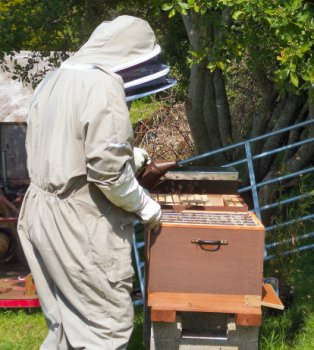
Two beekeepers in Cornwall, UK, checking their hives and using a smoker.

Most beekeepers are hobby beekeepers. These people typically work or own only a few hives. Their main attraction is an interest in ecology and natural science. Honey is a by-product of this hobby. As it typically requires a significant investment to establish a small apiary and dozens of hours of work with hives and honey equipment, hobby beekeeping is rarely profitable outside of Europe, where the lack of organic bee products sometimes causes buoyant demand for privately produced honey.

Beekeepers create profit by selling honey, honeycomb, and wax. Honey is high in demand. In 2018, it was reported as being worth more than oil in Kenya. Overall, beekeeping has potential to create not only a way for people to make extra money, but it also benefits the environment due to providing efficient cross pollination. However, starting a beekeeping business is costly. Initial investments are expensive, as typically the first year's profits are used to pay it off. Profit should be expected only after the second or third year. People who seem interested in having beehives in their backyard must also consider the legal aspect of the practice, as different cities have different laws regarding the use of beehives.

=== Sideline beekeepers ===
A sideline beekeeper attempts to make a profit keeping bees, but relies on another source of income. Sideliners may operate up to 300 colonies of bees, producing 10–20 metric tons of honey worth tens of thousands of US dollars each year.

=== Commercial beekeepers ===
Commercial beekeepers control hundreds or thousands of colonies of bees. The most extensive own and operate up to 50,000 colonies of bees, and they produce millions of pounds of honey. The first major commercial beekeeper was Petro Prokopovych from Ukraine, operating 6,600 colonies in the early 19th century. Moses Quinby was the first commercial beekeeper in the US, with 1,200 colonies by the 1840s. Later (1960s-1970s), Jim Powers of Idaho, USA, had 30,000 honey producing hives. Miel Carlota, managed by partners Arturo Wulfrath and Juan Speck of Mexico, operated at least 50,000 hives of honey bees from 1920 to 1960. Today, Adee Honey Farm in South Dakota, USA, (80,000 colonies) and Comvita in New Zealand (30,000+ colonies) are among the world's largest beekeeping enterprises. Worldwide, commercial beekeepers number about 5% of the individuals with bees, but produce around 60% of the world's honey crop.

Commercial beekeeping is on the rise, especially in high-value markets such as pollination in North America and honey production (particularly Manuka honey) in New Zealand.

== Equipment ==
Beekeepers wear protective suits to prevent injuries while working with the hives. Covering beekeepers from head to toe, the material, gloves, and veil contribute to the protection of the beekeeper.

== Notable beekeepers ==
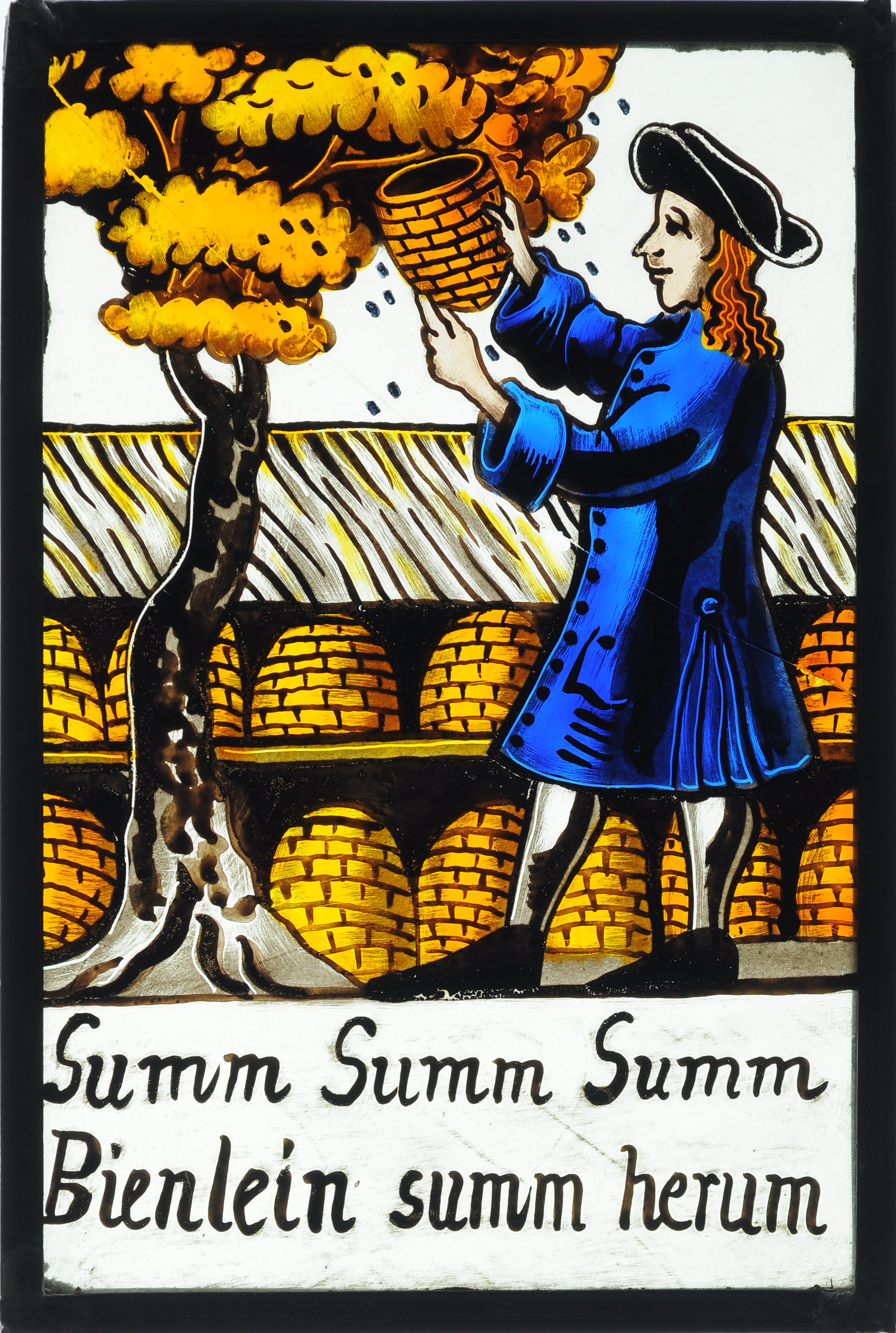
Beekeeper on an old German stained glass painting. Underneath the refrain of a children's song by Hoffmann von Fallersleben

Since Petro Prokopovych became the first major commercial beekeeper, there have been people along the way who have contributed to the success of keeping honey bees. From studying their genetics, to writing well-known novels, to constructing tools to assist in the industry, these beekeepers helped guide the profession.

- Petro Prokopovych
- Johann Dzierzon
- L. L. Langstroth
- Anton Janša
- Peter Pavel Glavar
- Émile Warré
- Brother Adam
- Moses Quinby
- Juraj Fándly
- Gregor Mendel
- Georges de Layens
- Robert A. Holekamp
- Charles Dadant
- Amos Root
- Walter T. Kelley
- Roger Morse
- Jacqueline Gowe
- Tarlton Rayment
- Erika Thompson
- Gordon Dougan
- Richard Clyde Taylor

Other practising keepers have included:

- Jiří Dienstbier Jr.
- Gordon Dougan
- Edmund Hillary
- Martha Kearney
- Bob Maguire
- Terry Nutkins
- Nayef Rajoub
- Paul Theroux
- Bill Turnbull
- Steve Vai
- Alfred Watkins
- James Hetfield

== In popular culture ==
The profession of beekeeping has manifested itself into fictional characters within both literature and movies, such as the detective Sherlock Holmes who retires to keep bees.

== See also ==
- Agriculture
- Beekeeping by country
- Gardening
- Organic farming
- Sustainable agriculture
