= Beeswax =

Natural wax produced by honey bees of the genus Apis

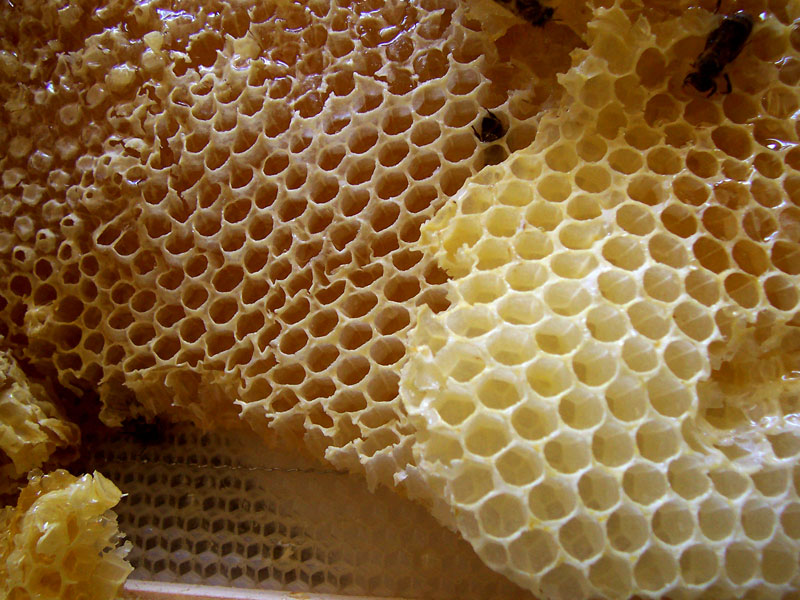
Bee hive wax complex

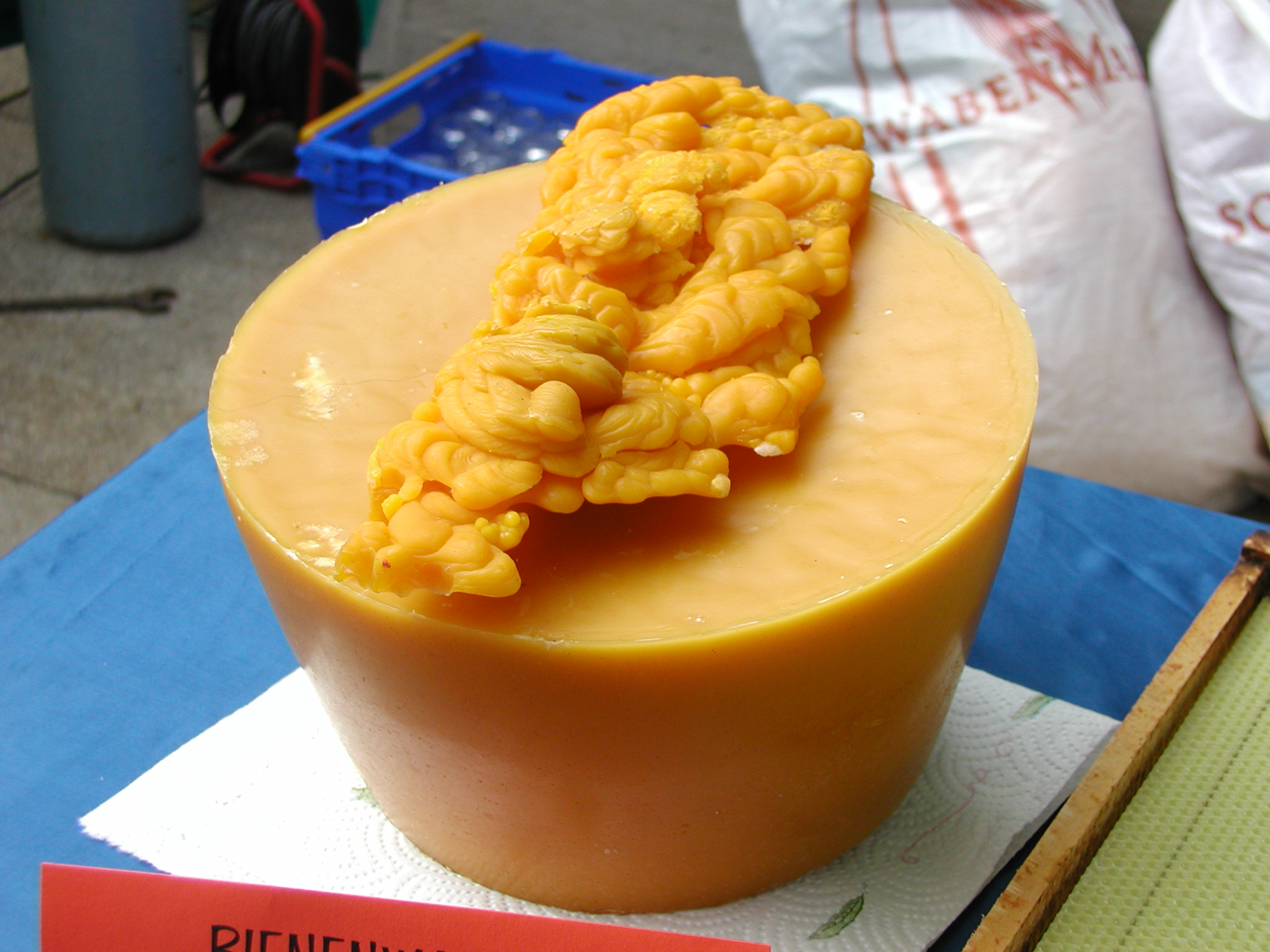
Beeswax cake

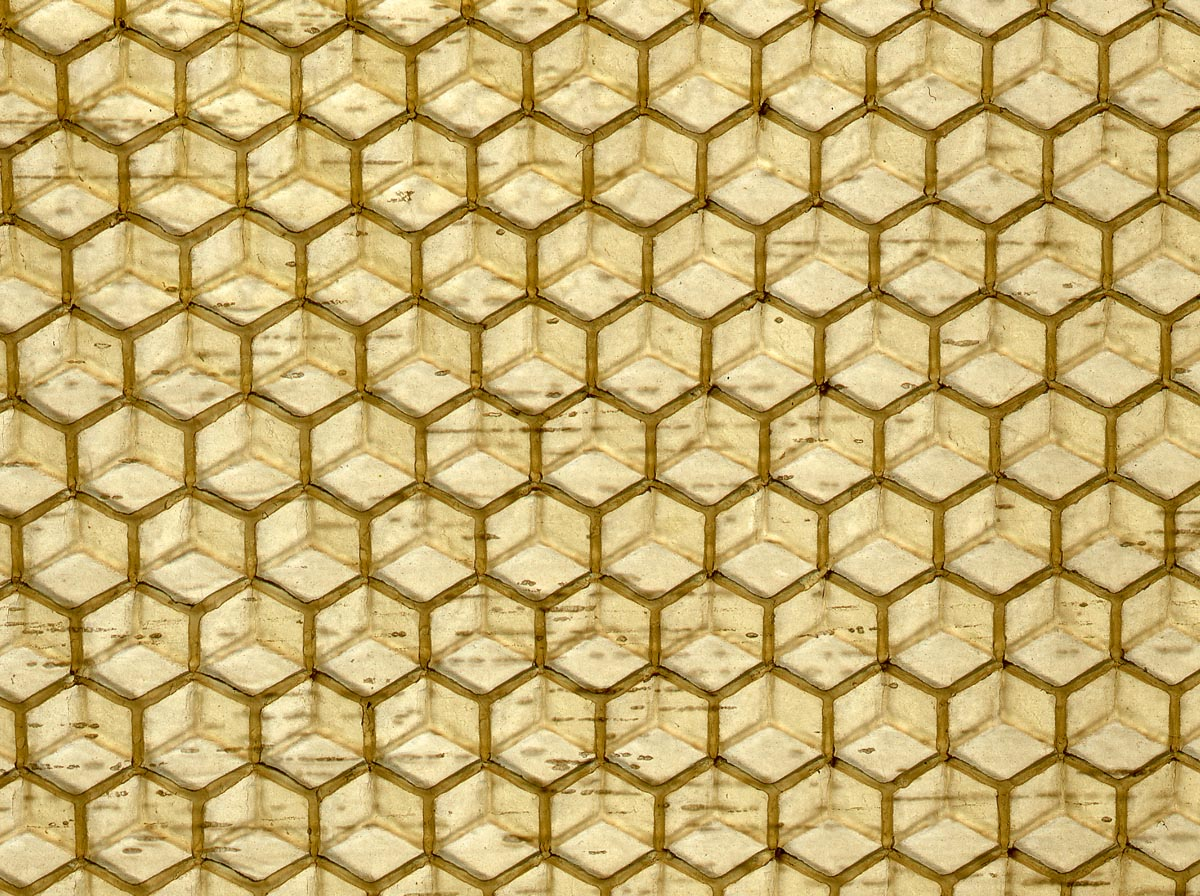
Commercial honeycomb foundation, made by pressing beeswax between patterned metal rollers

Beeswax (also known as cera alba) is a natural wax produced by honey bees of the genus Apis. The wax is formed into scales by eight wax-producing glands in the abdominal segments of worker bees, which discard it in or at the hive. The hive workers collect and use it to form cells for honey storage and larval and pupal protection within the beehive. Chemically, beeswax consists mainly of esters of fatty acids and various long-chain alcohols.

Beeswax has been used since prehistory as the first plastic, as a lubricant and waterproofing agent, in lost wax casting of metals and glass, as a polish for wood and leather, for making candles, as an ingredient in cosmetics and as an artistic medium in encaustic painting.

Beeswax is edible, having similarly negligible toxicity to plant waxes, and is approved for food use in most countries and in the European Union under the E number E901. However, due to its inability to be broken down by the human digestive system, it has insignificant nutritional value.

== Production ==
Beeswax is formed by worker bees, which secrete it from eight wax-producing mirror glands on the inner sides of the sternites (the ventral shield or plate of each segment of the body) on abdominal segments 4 to 7. The sizes of these wax glands depend on the age of the worker, and after many daily flights, these glands gradually begin to atrophy.

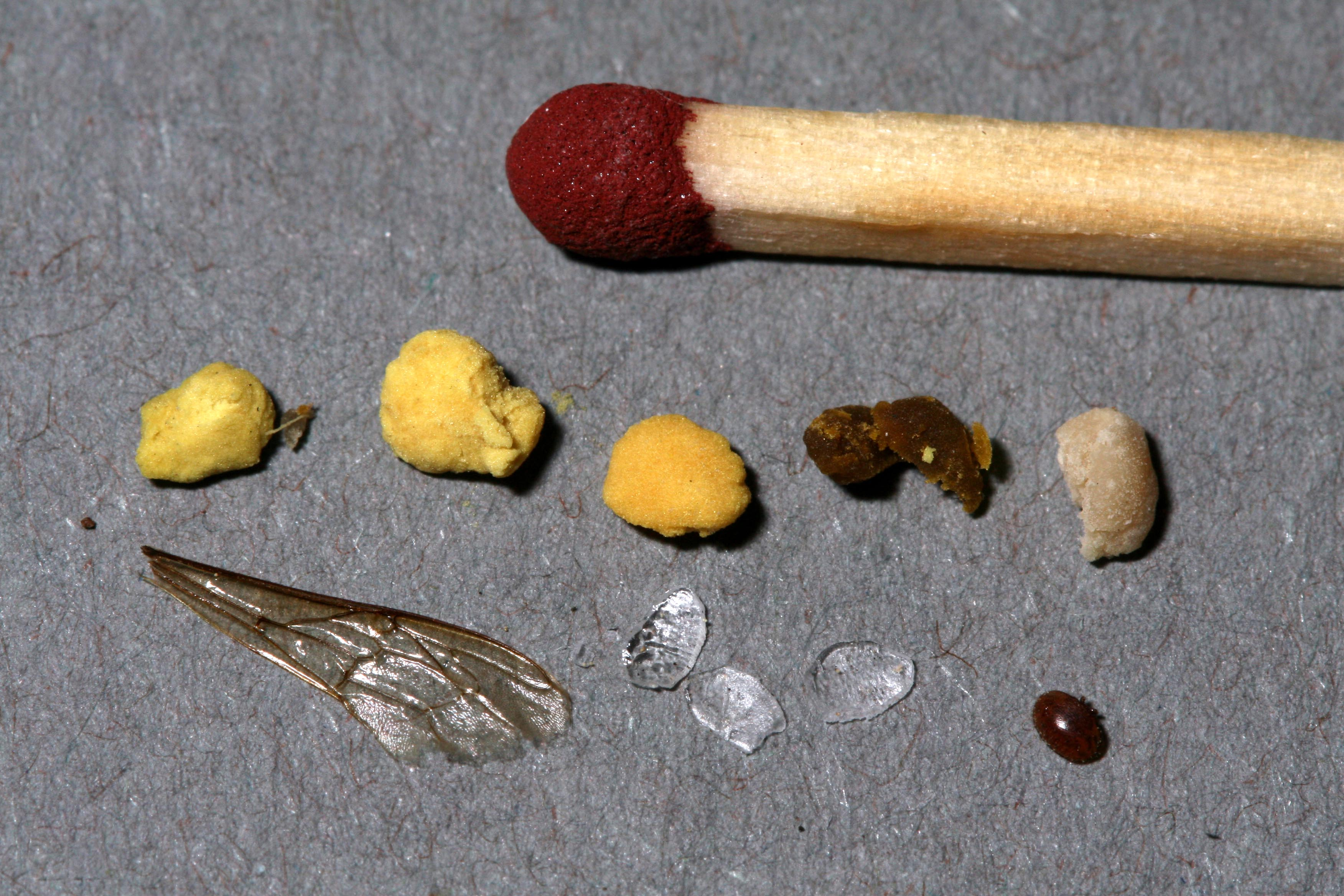
Fresh wax scales (in the middle of the bottom row)

The new wax is initially clear as glass and colorless, becoming opaque after chewing and being introduced with pollen by the hive worker bees, becoming progressively yellower or browner by incorporation of pollen oils and propolis. The wax scales are about three millimetres (0.12 in) across and 0.1 mm (0.0039 in) thick, and about 1100 are needed to make a gram of wax. Worker bees use the beeswax to build honeycomb cells. For the wax-making bees to secrete wax, the ambient temperature in the hive must be 33 to 36 °C (91 to 97 °F).

The book Beeswax Production, Harvesting, Processing and Products suggests one kilogram (2.2 lb) of beeswax is sufficient to store 22 kg (49 lb) of honey. Another study estimated that one kilogram (2.2 lb) of wax can store 24 to 30 kg (53 to 66 lb) of honey.

Sugars from honey are metabolized into beeswax in wax-gland-associated fat cells. The amount of honey used by bees to produce wax has not been accurately determined, but according to Whitcomb's 1946 experiment, 6.66 to 8.80 kg (14.7 to 19.4 lb) of honey yields one kilogram (2.2 lb) of wax.

== Processing ==
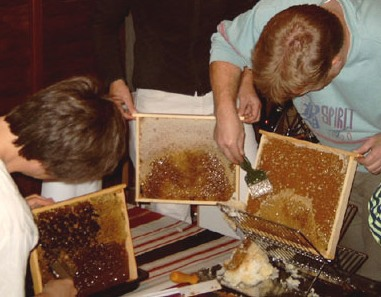
Uncapping beeswax honeycombs

Beeswax as a product for human use may come from cappings cut off the cells in the process of extraction, from old comb that is scrapped, or from unwanted burr comb and brace comb removed from a hive. Its color varies from nearly white to brownish, but most often is a shade of yellow, depending on purity, the region, and the type of flowers gathered by the bees. The wax from the brood comb of the honey bee hive tends to be darker than wax from the honeycomb because impurities accumulate more quickly in the brood comb. Due to the impurities, the wax must be rendered before further use. The leftovers are called slumgum, and is derived from old breeding rubbish (pupa casings, cocoons, shed larva skins, etc.), bee droppings, propolis, and general rubbish.

The wax may be clarified further by heating in water. As with petroleum waxes, it may be softened by dilution with mineral oil or vegetable oil to make it more workable at room temperature.

== Physical characteristics ==
Wax content type	Percentage
Hydrocarbons	14
Monoesters	35
Diesters	14
Triesters	3
Hydroxy monoesters	4
Hydroxy polyesters	8
Acid esters	1
Acid polyesters	2
Free fatty acids	12
Free fatty alcohols	1
Unidentified	6

Beeswax is a fragrant solid at room temperature. The colors are light yellow, medium yellow, or dark brown and white. Beeswax is a tough wax formed from a mixture of several chemical compounds.

Beeswax has a relatively low melting point range of 62 to 64 °C (144 to 147 °F). If beeswax is heated above 85 °C (185 °F) discoloration occurs. The flash point of beeswax is 254 °C (489 °F).

When natural beeswax is at room temperature (~20–25 °C), it is brittle, and its fracture is dry and granular.. At room temperature (conventionally taken as about 20 °C (68 °F)), it is tenacious and it softens further at human body temperature (37 °C (99 °F)).

== Chemical composition ==
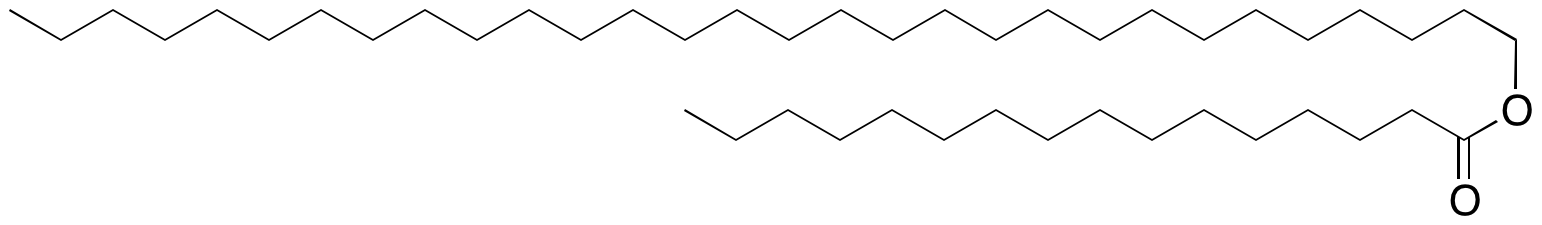
Triacontanyl palmitate, a wax ester, is a major component of beeswax.

An approximate chemical formula for beeswax is C_{15}H_{31}COOC_{30}H_{61}. Its main constituents are palmitate, palmitoleate, and oleate esters of long-chain (30–32 carbons) aliphatic alcohols, with the ratio of triacontanyl-palmitate CH_{3}(CH_{2})_{29}O-CO-(CH_{2})_{14}CH_{3} to cerotic acid CH_{3}(CH_{2})_{24}COOH, the two principal constituents, being 6:1.Beeswax can be classified generally into European and Oriental types. The saponification value is lower (3–5) for European beeswax, and higher (8–9) for Oriental types. The analytical characterization can be done by high-temperature gas chromatography.

== Adulteration ==
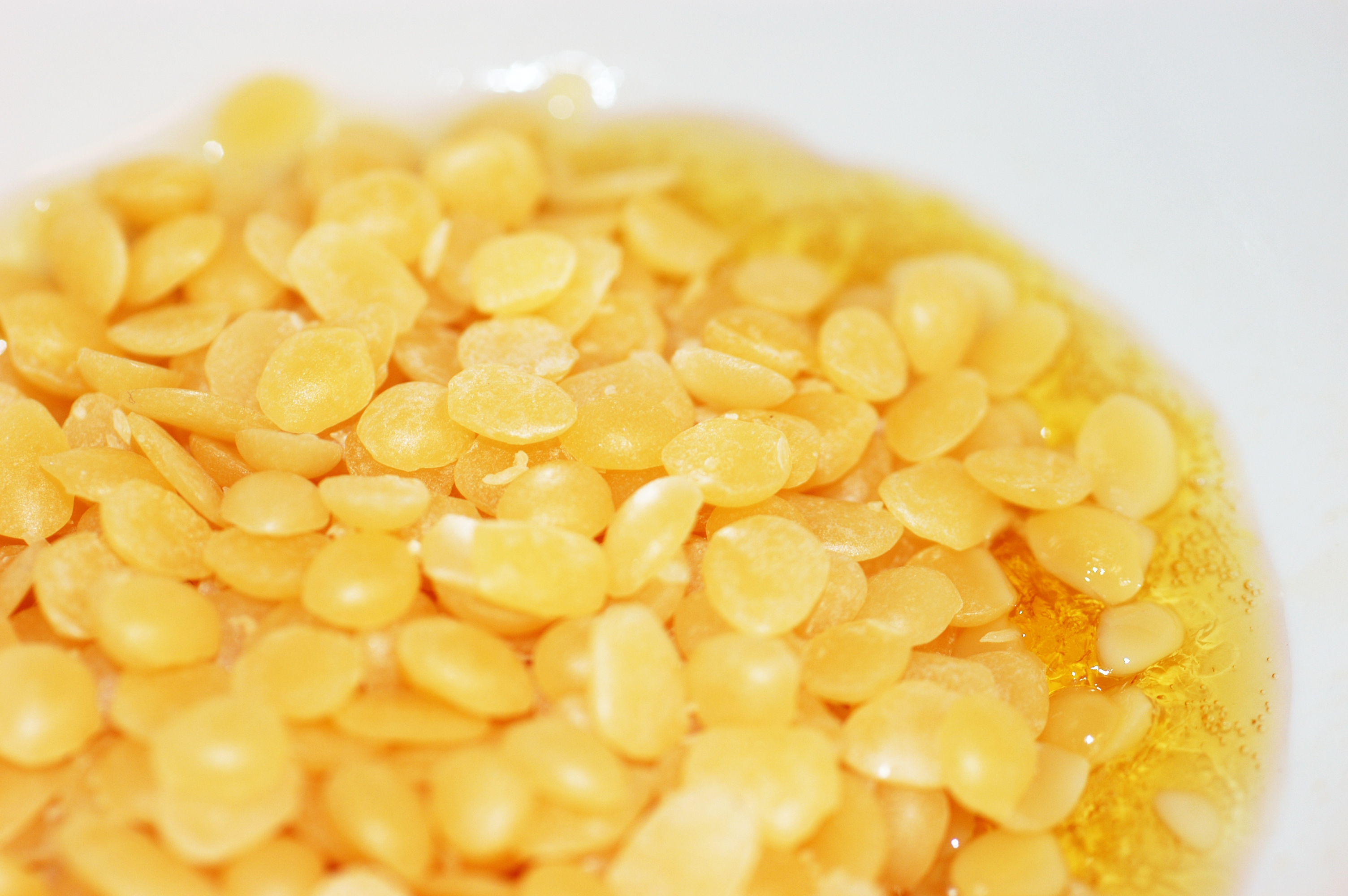
Beeswax refined in pellet form

Beeswax faces challenges in the market due to the presence of various suppliers, making it difficult to distinguish authentic from fake variants. Adulterated beeswax often contains paraffin and toxic additives, posing potential health risks and lacking the genuine honey-scented aroma of pure beeswax.

Pharmaceutical grades of pure beeswax are distributed in the shape of pellets for the cosmetic, pharmaceutical and food industries, among other uses.

== Production ==
Beeswax production – 2020
Country	Tonnes
India	23,716
Ethiopia	5,339
Argentina	4,970
Turkey	3,765
South Korea	3,758
World	62,116
Source: FAOSTAT

In 2020, world production of beeswax was 62,116 tonnes, led by India with 38% of the total.

Production of beeswax

== Uses ==
Candle-making has long involved the use of beeswax, which burns readily and cleanly, and this material was traditionally prescribed for the making of the Paschal candle or "Easter candle". Beeswax candles are purported to be superior to other wax candles, because they burn brighter and longer, do not bend, and burn cleaner. It is further recommended for the making of other candles used in the liturgy of the Roman Catholic Church. Beeswax is also the candle constituent of choice in the Eastern Orthodox Church.

Refined beeswax plays a prominent role in art materials both as a binder in encaustic paint and as a stabilizer in oil paint to add body.

Beeswax is an ingredient in surgical bone wax, which is used during surgery to control bleeding from bone surfaces; shoe polish and furniture polish can both use beeswax as a component, dissolved in turpentine or sometimes blended with linseed oil or tung oil; modeling waxes can also use beeswax as a component; pure beeswax can also be used as an organic surfboard wax. Beeswax blended with pine rosin is used for waxing, and can serve as an adhesive to attach reed plates to the structure inside a squeezebox. It can also be used to make Cutler's resin, an adhesive used to glue handles onto cutlery knives. It is used in Eastern Europe in egg decoration; it is used for writing, via resist dyeing, on batik eggs (as in pysanky) and for making beaded eggs. Beeswax is used by percussionists to make a surface on tambourines for thumb rolls. It can also be used as a metal injection moulding binder component along with other polymeric binder materials.

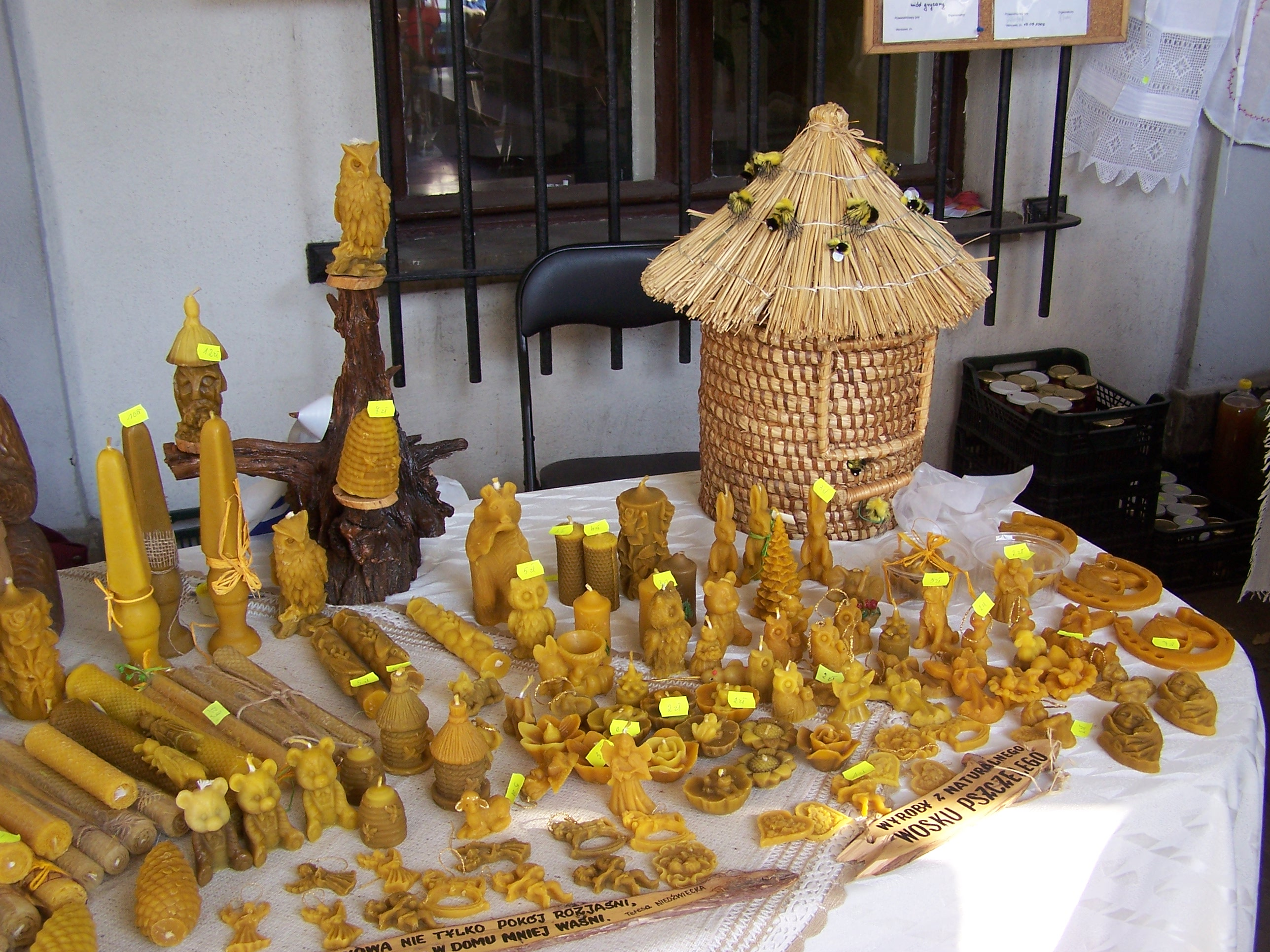
Beeswax candles and figures

Beeswax was formerly used in the manufacture of phonograph cylinders. It may still be used to seal formal legal or royal decree and academic parchments such as placing an awarding stamp imprimatur of the university upon completion of postgraduate degrees.

Purified and bleached beeswax is used in the production of food, cosmetics, and pharmaceuticals. The three main types of beeswax products are yellow, white, and beeswax absolute. Yellow beeswax is the crude product obtained from the honeycomb, white beeswax is bleached or filtered yellow beeswax, and beeswax absolute is yellow beeswax treated with alcohol. In food preparation, it is used as a coating for cheese; by sealing out the air, protection is given against spoilage (mold growth). Beeswax may also be used as a food additive E901, in small quantities acting as a glazing agent, which serves to prevent water loss, or used to provide surface protection for some fruits. Soft gelatin capsules and tablet coatings may also use E901. Beeswax is also a common ingredient of natural chewing gum. The wax monoesters in beeswax are poorly hydrolysed in the guts of humans and other mammals, so they have insignificant nutritional value. Some birds, such as honeyguides, can digest beeswax. Beeswax is the main diet of wax moth larvae.

The use of beeswax in skin care and cosmetics has been increasing. A German study found beeswax to be superior to similar barrier creams (usually mineral oil-based creams such as petroleum jelly), when used according to its protocol. Beeswax is used in lip balm, lip gloss, hand creams, salves, and moisturizers; and in cosmetics such as eye shadow, blush, and eye liner. Beeswax is also an important ingredient in moustache wax and hair pomades, which make hair look sleek and shiny.

In oil spill control, beeswax is processed to create Petroleum Remediation Product (PRP). It is used to absorb oil or petroleum-based pollutants from water.

== Historical uses ==
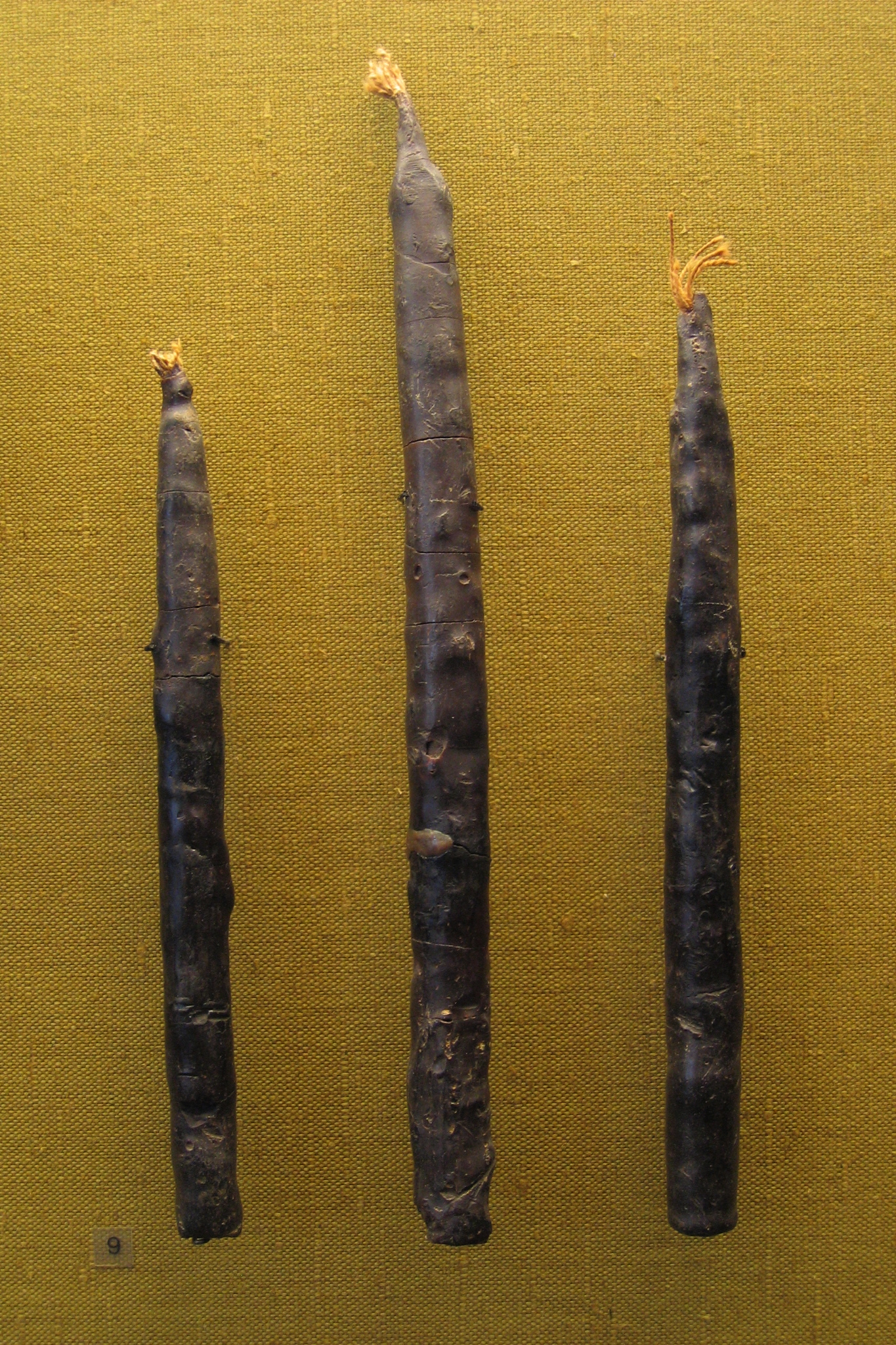
Beeswax candles, Alamannic graveyard (Oberflacht, Germany), 6th/7th century AD

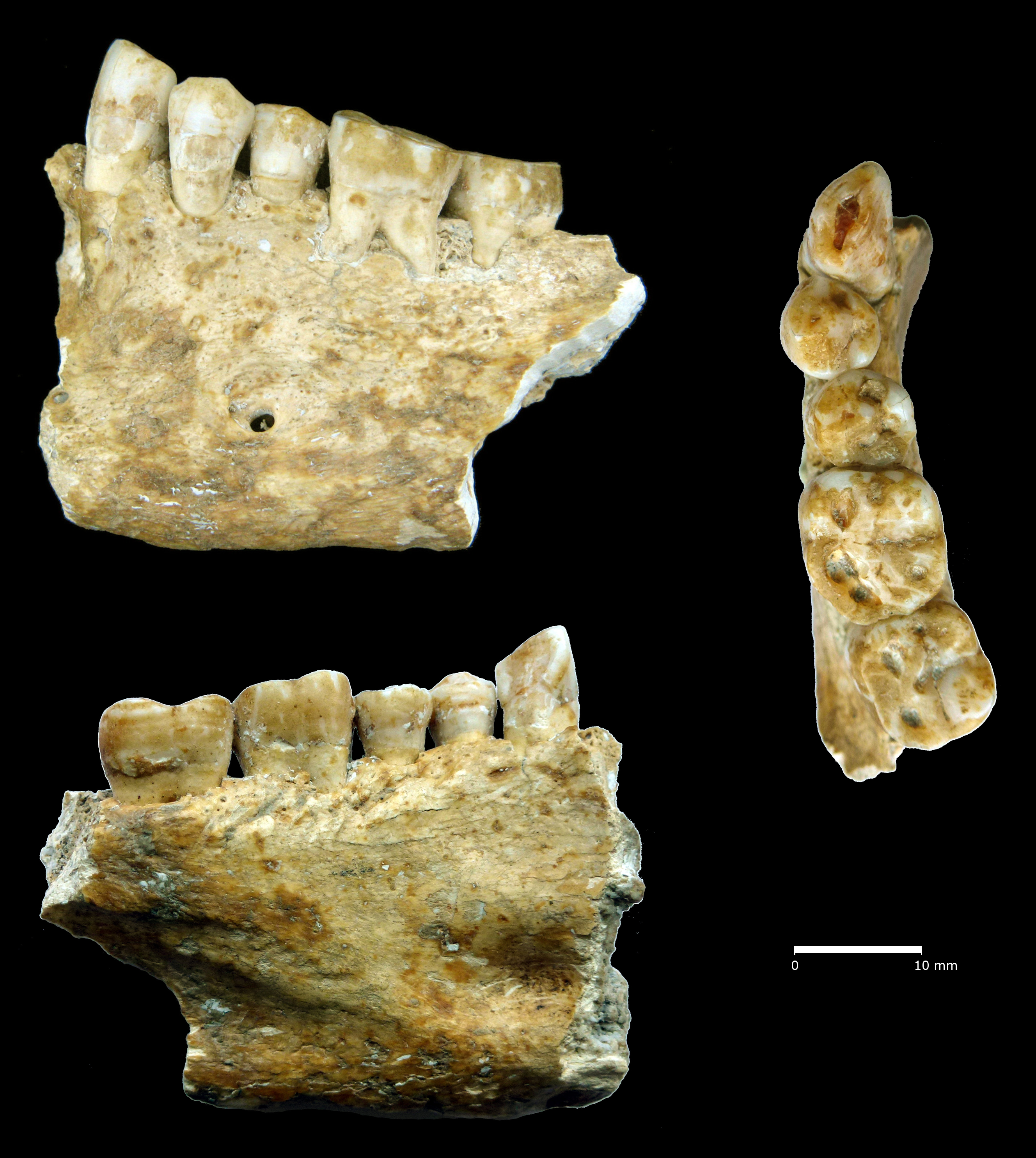
Beeswax as Neolithic dental filling

Beeswax was among the first plastics to be used, alongside other natural polymers such as gutta-percha, horn, tortoiseshell, and shellac. For thousands of years, beeswax has had a wide variety of applications; it has been found in the tombs of Egypt, in wrecked Viking ships, and in Roman ruins. Beeswax never goes bad and can be heated and reused. Historically, it has been used:

- As candles - the oldest intact beeswax candles north of the Alps were found in the Alamannic graveyard of Oberflacht, Germany, dating to 6th/7th century AD
- In the manufacture of cosmetics
- As a modelling material in the lost-wax casting process, or cire perdue
- For wax tablets used for a variety of writing purposes
- In encaustic paintings such as the Fayum mummy portraits
- In bow making
- To strengthen and preserve sewing thread, cordage, shoe laces, etc.
- As a component of sealing wax
- To strengthen and to forestall splitting and cracking of wind instrument reeds
- To form the mouthpieces of a didgeridoo, and the frets on the Philippine kutiyapi – a type of boat lute
- As a sealant or lubricant for bullets in cap and ball firearms
- To stabilize the military explosive Torpex – before being replaced by a petroleum-based product
- In producing Javanese batik
- As an ancient form of dental tooth filling
- As the joint filler in the slate bed of pool and billiard tables.

== See also ==
- Carnauba wax
- Candelilla wax
- Paraffin wax
- Ozokerite (ceresin)
- Spermaceti
- Wax ester
