= Smoke pot =

Smoke pot may refer to:

- Smoke signal device, usually a canister
- Bee smoker

== See also ==
- Smoke grenade
