= Slum (disambiguation) =

Slum is a term for poor residential areas.

Slum or slums may also refer to:

- Slum (film), a 2013 Indian Kannada-language crime-film
- Slum, Croatia, a village near Lanišće, Istria
- The Slum, the English name of O Cortiço, an 1890 Brazilian novel written by Aluísio Azevedo
- Student slum, a term for student residential areas
- Slum gum, the residue of the beeswax-rendering process
- Net Slum, a setting in the Japanese online game .hack
- SLUMS Exam, Saint Louis University Mental Status Exam: a test to assess human cognition
- Slums (song), a 2017 song by Wyclef Jean from the album Carnival III: The Fall and Rise of a Refugee
- Slum or slumgullion – a stew of meat, vegetables and pasta, also known as American goulash
