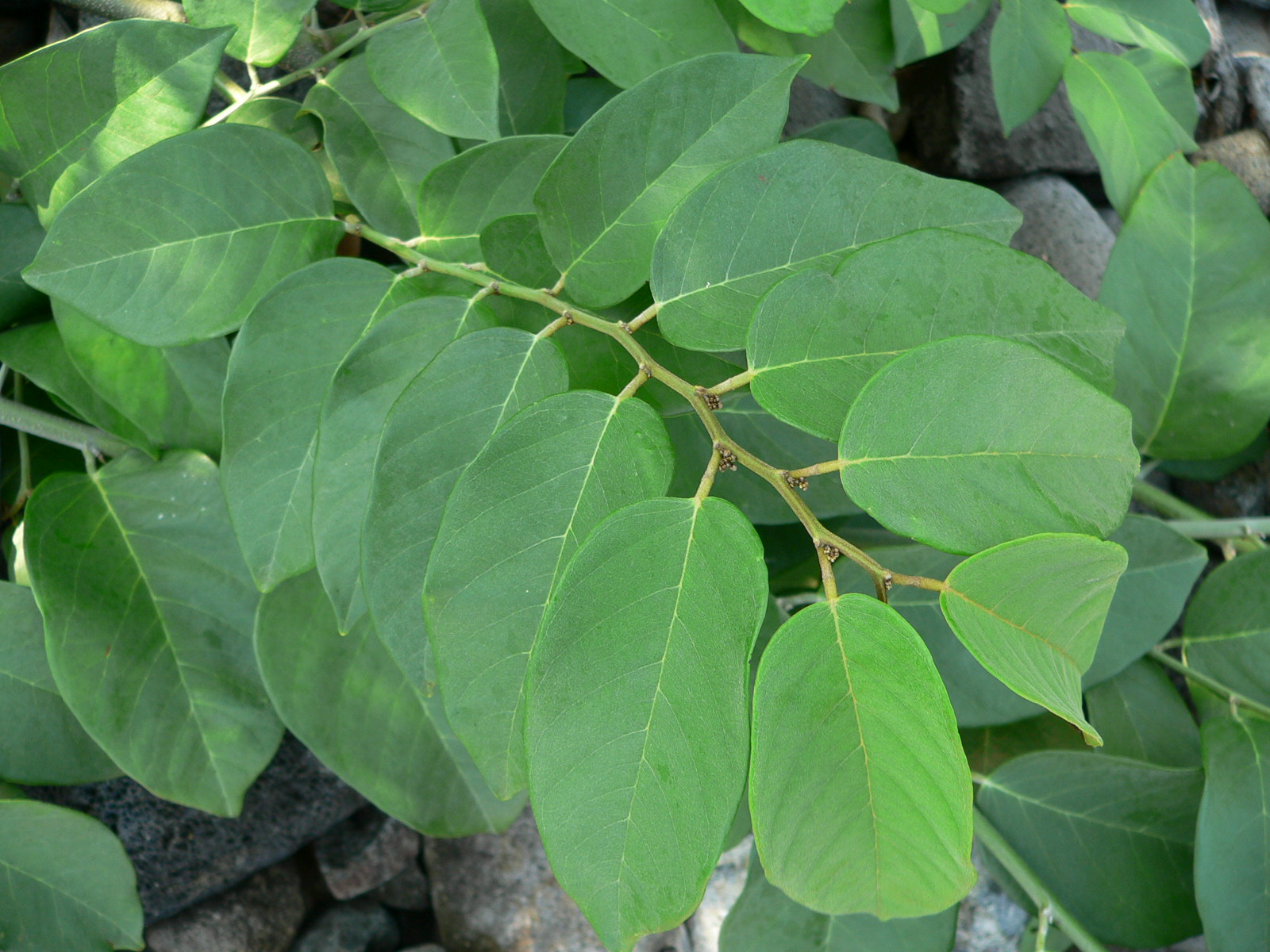
- Foliage
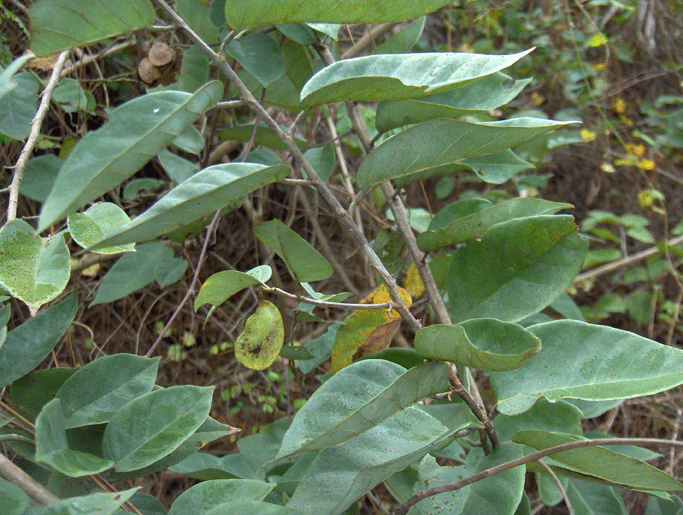
- Woody parts

Conservation status
- Least Concern (IUCN 3.1)

Scientific classification
- Kingdom: Plantae
- Clade: Tracheophytes
- Clade: Angiosperms
- Clade: Eudicots
- Clade: Rosids
- Order: Fabales
- Family: Fabaceae
- Subfamily: Faboideae
- Genus: Dalbergia
- Species: D. ecastaphyllum

Binomial name
- Dalbergia ecastaphyllum (L.) Taub.

Synonyms
- List: Amerimnon ecastaphyllum (L.) Standl.; Amerimnon malifolium (Welw. ex Baker) Kuntze; Amerimnon sieberi Rchb. ex DC.; Dalbergia ecastophyllum var. cuprea Pellegr.; Dalbergia malifolia Welw. ex Baker; Ecastaphyllum brownei Pers.; Ecastaphyllum ecastaphyllum (L.) Huth; Hedysarum ecastaphyllum L.; Pterocarpus ecastaphyllum (L.) L.

= Dalbergia ecastaphyllum =

Species of plant

Dalbergia ecastaphyllum, the coinvine, is a species of flowering plant in the family Fabaceae. It is native to tropical and subtropical coastal areas on both sides of the Atlantic, and it has been introduced to India. A scrambling shrub or small tree, it is found in mangrove swamps and other brackish wetlands at elevations from 0 to 20 m (0 to 66 ft) above sea level. It is the source of Brazilian red propolis.
