= Cutler's resin =

Waterproofing adhesive used in knife-making

Cutler's resin, also known as cutler's pitch, is a waterproof adhesive used to secure a blade or device to a handle. It is made by including wax when making a pine pitch glue. Cutler's resin commonly consists of pine pitch, beeswax and/or carnauba wax, and usually employs a filler like charcoal, sawdust and/or animal dung to aid with the bond. It has been used for centuries by cutlers to attach knife and sword handles, and as a fastener for other tools and weapons.
