= Erika Thompson =

American beekeeper (born 1986)

- Born: 1986 (age 38–39); Katy, Texas, US
- Education: University of Texas at Austin
- Occupation: Beekeeper

TikTok information
- Page: TexasBeeworks
- Followers: 11.3 million
- Last updated: April 10, 2023

Erika Thompson (born 1986) is an American beekeeper with more than 11 million followers on TikTok. She posts videos of herself handling bees with her bare hands and wearing no protective gear. She lives in Smithville, Texas, and keeps almost 50 beehives in her backyard.

== Early life ==
Thompson was born in 1986 and grew up in Katy, Texas, United States. She attended the University of Texas at Austin. After college, Thompson worked as a communications director for a nonprofit. She lived in the Austin area until 2019.

== Career ==
Thompson worked for the Texas Hotel and Lodging Association and the Austin chapter of the American Institute of Architects and her hobby was beekeeping. In 2016, she founded Texas Beeworks in the Austin, Texas, metropolitan area. She has stated that her mission is to put "hives before honey". She also says that the mission of her company, Texas Beeworks, is to promote public awareness about bees and beekeepers. Her organization removes bees for free.

In 2018, the television quiz show Jeopardy! recorded video clues about bees for an episode of the show. The videos featured Thompson's organization Texas Beeworks. The show aired on Memorial Day in 2019, and by that time Thompson had already left her job to become a full-time beekeeper.

Thompson typically posts videos of herself relocating beehives; she scoops up handfuls of bees with her bare hands and wears no beekeeping equipment while handling the bees. By 2021, she had amassed 6 million followers on TikTok. By 2023, she had 11.4 million following her account which she named Texas Beeworks. One of her TikTok videos quickly amassed 60 million views. She finishes each of her TikTok videos by saying "It was another great day of saving the bees".

=== Controversy ===
In 2021 some TikTok followers questioned whether the videos of her handling bees using no protective equipment were fake. There were questions about whether or not she had sedated the bees. She was also accused of staging bee rescues. Thompson responded on Instagram by saying it was a "series of untrue and hurtful attacks". In 2021 CNN interviewed another professional beekeeper who stated that Thompson's videos set a "dangerous precedent" on how people should interact with bees safely. To respond to the controversy Thompson released a statement to the cable news network.

As a professional beekeeper, it's my mission and my purpose to help people understand how important the work of bees and beekeepers is to our world. The content I share is real, and shows how beekeepers help people and bees in need every day—wearing protective gear when necessary. Only experienced beekeepers should be handling bees and performing bee removal services.

== Personal life ==
Thompson lives in Smithville, Texas. She has an apiary with two rows of boxes at her home. Her backyard has approximately 50 beehives.
