= Carnauba wax =

Natural plant wax from leaves of the carnauba palm

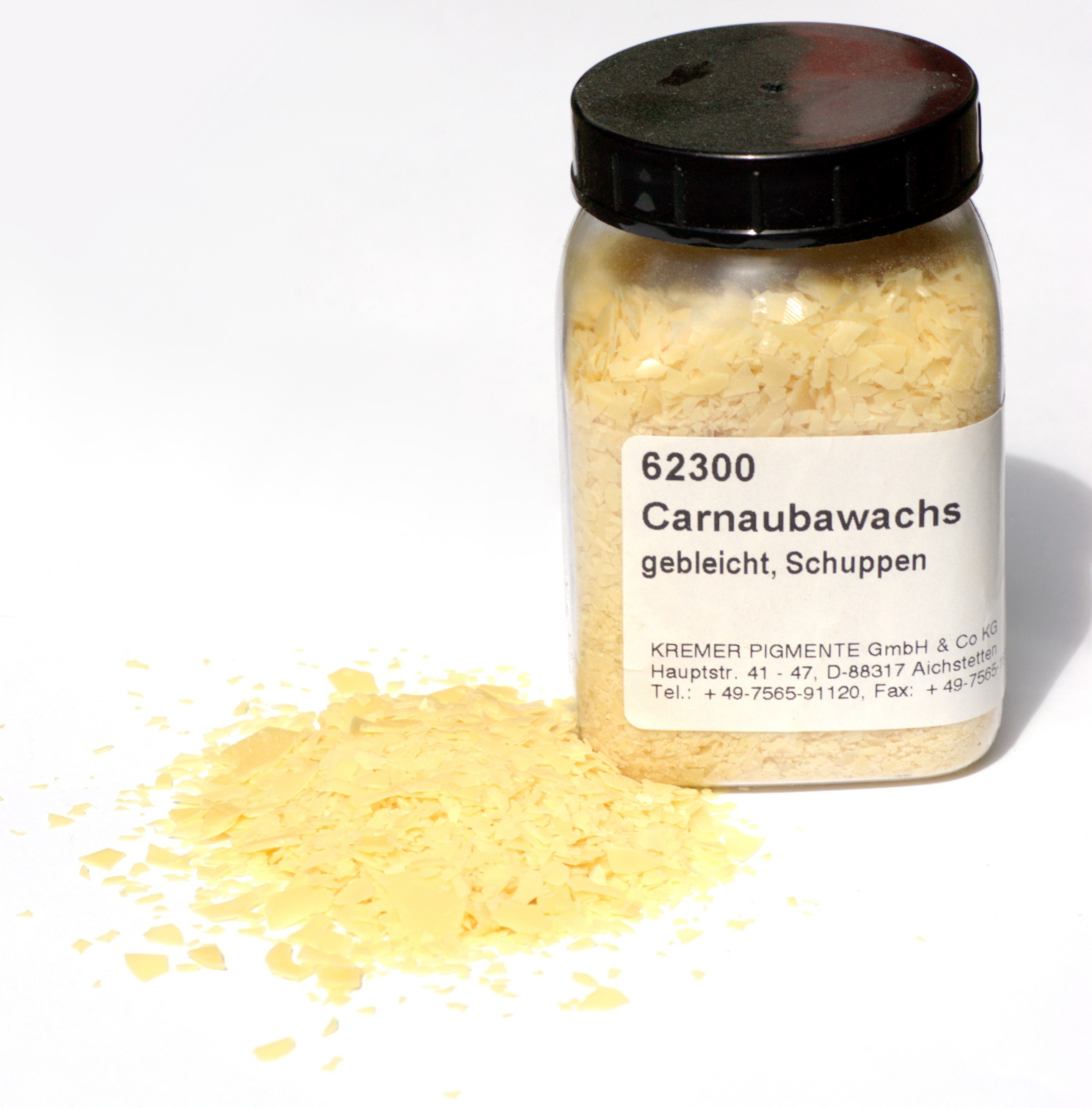

Identifiers
CAS Number	8015-86-9
ECHA InfoCard	100.029.451
E number	E903 (glazing agents, ...)
CompTox Dashboard (EPA)	DTXSID3044178

Properties
Appearance	Yellow-brown solid
Density	~0.97 g/cm^{3}
Melting point	82–86 °C (180–187 °F; 355–359 K)
Solubility in water	Insoluble
- Except where otherwise noted, data are given for materials in their standard state (at 25 °C [77 °F], 100 kPa). Infobox references

Carnauba (/kɑːrˈnɔːbə, -ˈnaʊ-, -ˈnuː-, -nɑːˈuː-/; Portuguese: carnaúba [kaʁnaˈubɐ]), also called Brazil wax and palm wax, is a wax of the leaves of the carnauba palm Copernicia prunifera (synonym: Copernicia cerifera), a plant native to and grown only in the northeastern Brazilian states of Ceará, Piauí, Paraíba, Pernambuco, Rio Grande do Norte, Maranhão and Bahia. It is known as the "Queen of Waxes". In its pure state, it is usually available in the form of hard yellow-brown flakes. It is obtained by collecting and drying the leaves, beating them to loosen the wax, then refining and bleaching it. As a food additive, its E number is E903.

== Composition ==
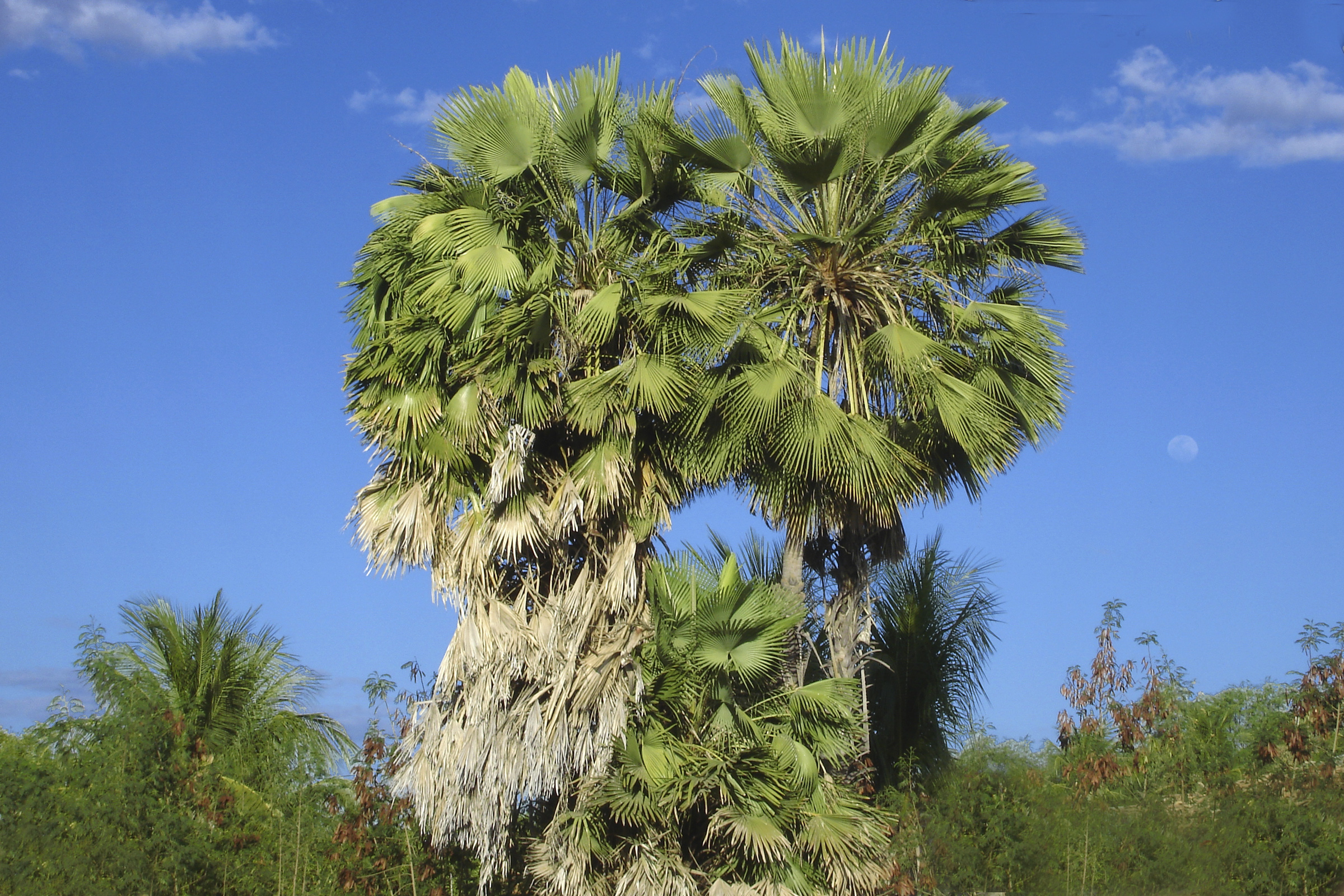
Carnauba palm

Carnauba consists mostly of aliphatic esters (40 wt%), diesters of 4-hydroxycinnamic acid (21.0 wt%), ω-hydroxycarboxylic acids (13.0 wt%), and fatty alcohols (12 wt%). The compounds are predominantly derived from acids and alcohols in the C26-C30 range. It is distinctive for its high content of diesters and its methoxycinnamic acid.

It is sold in grades of T1, T3 and T4 according to its purity level, which is accomplished by filtration, centrifugation and bleaching.

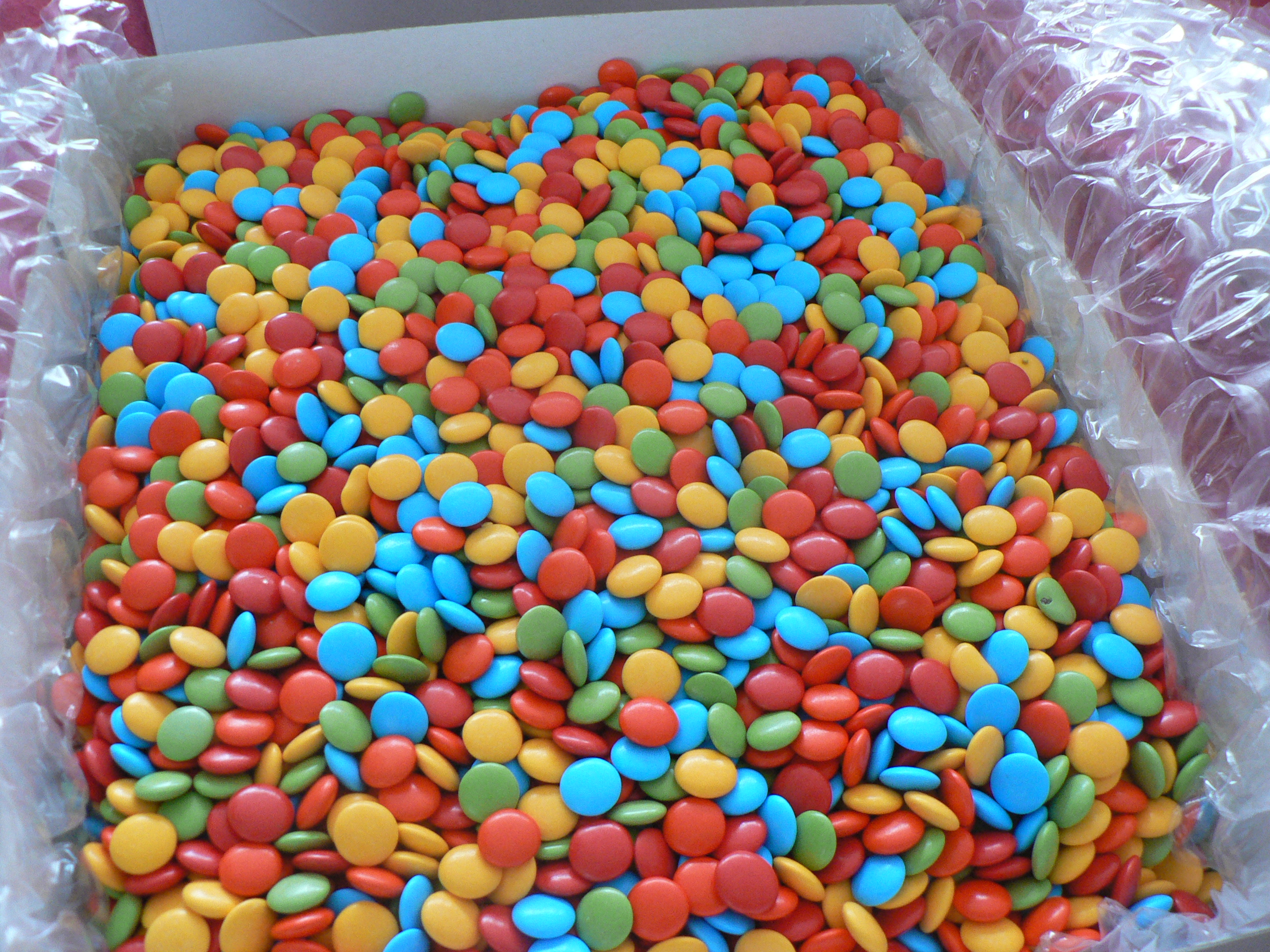
Chocolate dragées coated with carnauba wax

== Properties ==
As it creates a glossy finish, carnauba wax is used in automobile waxes, shoe polishes, dental floss, food products (such as sweets), polishes for musical instruments, and floor and furniture waxes and polishes. It is commonly used for paper coatings in the United States.

It is also used to make cutler's resin for attaching handles to bladed tools and weapons.

Although too brittle to be used alone, carnauba wax is often combined with other waxes (principally beeswax) to treat and waterproof leather products, where it provides a high-gloss finish and increases leather's hardness and durability.

In 1890, carnauba wax was patented as a replacement for the standard paraffin/beeswax mixture used in phonograph cylinders.

Carnauba wax may be used as a mold release agent for manufacturing fibre-reinforced plastics. An aerosol form is made by dissolving it in a solvent. Unlike silicone or PTFE, carnauba is suitable for use with liquid epoxy, epoxy molding compounds (EMC), and some other plastic types. It is not very soluble in chlorinated or aromatic hydrocarbons.

It is used in melt/castable explosives to produce an insensitive explosive formula such as Composition B, which is a blend of RDX and TNT.

== Production and export ==
According to the German television program Markencheck, conditions for many carnauba production workers are quite poor; one Brazilian Labor Ministry official found conditions "that could be described as slavery."

According to the Brazilian Ministry of Development, Industry and Foreign Trade, the major destinations for exported carnauba wax are:

- United States (25%)
- Japan (15–25%)
- Germany (10–15%)
- Netherlands (5%)
- Italy (5%)
- China (5%)
- Other countries (13%)

The Initiative for Responsible Carnauba (IRC) was founded in 2018 as part of the Private Business Action for Biodiversity project, in association with the Union for Ethical Biotrade (UEBT). Its aim is to foster responsible production that respects workers’ rights and preserves biodiversity. In an established working group with 20 local manufacturers and international distributors and brands, the IRC has set social, traceability and biodiversity standards and helped local producers implement them, with the UEBT's support. In collaboration with the local NGO Associação Caatinga, the Initiative has created a manual of good practices for the sector and 12 short learning videos, to inform field workers of their rights and about good biodiversity practices.

== Technical characteristics ==
- INCI name: Copernicia cerifera (carnauba) wax
- Melting point: 82–86 °C (180–187 °F) (among the highest of natural waxes; higher than beeswax, 62–64 °C (144–147 °F))
- Relative density: ~0.97
- Among the hardest of natural waxes
- Practically insoluble in water or ethyl alcohol
- Soluble by heating in ethyl acetate or xylene
