= Jacqueline Gowe =

Zimbabwean beekeeper and community activist

Jacqueline Gowe is a Zimbabwean apiarist and community activist. She is the president of the Zimbabwean chapter of the African Women in Animal Resources Farming and Agribusiness Network, and African Union project which teaches women farming and agribusiness skills.

== Biography ==
Gowe was born and grew up in Zimbabwe. She pursued healthcare education abroad, specializing in the care of liver transplant recipients. While living and working in the United Kingdom, Gowe had to leave her career to return to Zimbabwe to care for her ailing mother. Upon returning to Zimbabwe, she was unable to find employment in her field. An uncle suggested she try beekeeping on her late father's property, despite never trying it before. Her uncle trained her in honey production, establishing their first hives on their farm in Rusape.

=== Sweet Maungwe ===
In 2012, Gowe founded Sweet Maungwe, a business producing honey products. The company is named after her uncle who suggested taking up beekeeping and for their Maungwe tribe. Today, Sweet Maungwe ships its products internationally, with clients in the European Union, the Middle East and China.

=== Beekeeping advocacy ===
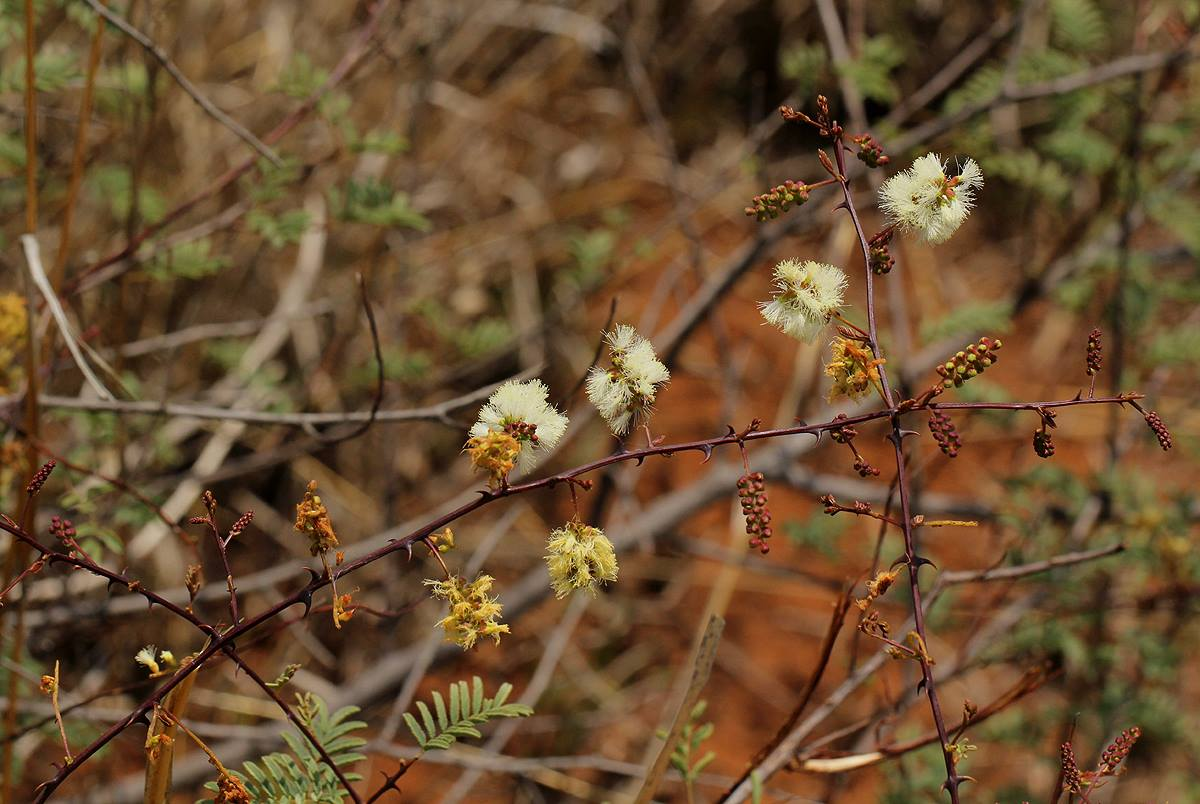
Gowe is vocal in advocating for beekeeping's role in preventing deforestation in Zimbabwe, as the country's acacia trees serve as an important source of nectar for honeybees.

Since becoming a beekeeper, Gowe has been a strong advocate for increasing the production of honey in Zimbabwe, which remains low compared to its neighbors, and despite increased demand. As chairperson of the National Apiculture Association of Zimbabwe, she has lobbied for increased funding to help new farmers establish themselves in the industry, and for international support of the Zimbabwean honey industry in supporting the country against food insecurity. Gowe additionally promotes the work that beekeeping in Zimbabwe can safeguard against deforestation.

=== Zimbabwe AWARFA ===
In 2021, Gowe became the chairperson and president of the newly launched Zimbabwean African Women in Animal Resources Farming and Agribusiness Network (AWARFA-N). The organization advocates for female farmers working in livestock and for creating opportunities for women to contribute to food security. The AWARFA-N project was developed in 2019 as part of an African Union cooperative enterprise. Zimbabwe was the third country to launch an AWARFA-N program after Ghana and Zambia. By 2023, the Zimbabwean African Women in Animal Resources Farming and Agribusiness Network had trained over 5,000 women and girls to become beekeepers.
