= Moses Quinby =

American beekeeper (1810–1875)

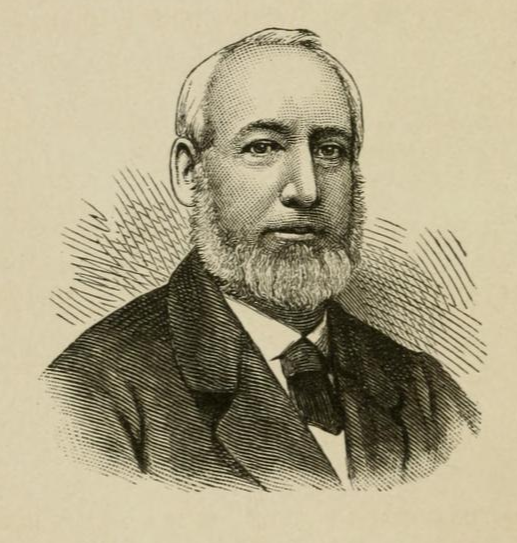
- Born: April 16, 1810; New Castle, New York, U.S.
- Died: May 26, 1875 (aged 65); St. Johnsville, New York, U.S.
- Occupations: beekeeper; beekeeping equipment inventor; author
- Years active: 1828-1875
- Known for: Inventor of the bee smoker and the New Quinby Hive; Father of practical Beekeeping; Father of commercial beekeeping in America
- Notable work: Mysteries of Bee Keeping Explained; Langstroth on the Hive and the Honeybee–a Beekeeper’s Manual
- Title: President of the North American Beekeepers' Association (1871)
- Spouse: Martha Powell Norbury
- Children: John William Quinby; Elizabeth Hannah Quinby

Moses Quinby (April 15 or 16, 1810 – May 26, 1875) was an American beekeeper from the State of New York. He is remembered as the father of practical beekeeping and the father of commercial beekeeping in America. He is best known as the inventor of the bee smoker with bellows. He was the author of numerous articles and several books on beekeeping.

== Life ==
=== Early life ===
Moses Quinby was born on April 15 or 16, 1810, in a Quaker family to William and Hannah Sands Quinby in New Castle, NY. In 1820-1822, his family moved to Greene County, New York. As an adult, he ran a lathe and woodworking equipment at the Pazzi Lampman sawmill.

In Coxsackie, NY, he took on beekeeping in 1828 to complement his income and started experimenting with woodware and leveraging his woodworking skills. This is where he kept bees, hosted beekeepers, and taught.

He married Martha Powell Norbury (also a Quaker) on September 8, 1832, at the Norbury homestead known as Grimeles where she was born. She was born on December 18, 1813, to John Norbury and Mary Norbury née Fosdick. He earned a living in the early years by doing turning-lathe and cabinet work as well as building hives and other bee equipment. He remained true to his Quaker heritage and was part of the Temperance Movement and was anti-slavery. He believed in God and that He had made all things possible. He felt obligated to share what He had given him and therefore never patented his inventions or copyrighted his books or publications.

My uncompromising hostility to every sort of patent hive is known. I am glad to see resistance to them anywhere, not because they are always worthless, but because, generally speaking, they have been one unmitigated swindle.

— Moses Quinby

They had two children:

- John William Quinby: born October 4, 1833, in Coxsackie, NY. He became a pastor of the Unitarian Church in Eastbridgewater, MA for thirty years. He died in 1911 at the age of 78.
- Elizabeth Hannah Quinby: born July 9, 1837. On December 15, 1869, she married Lyman C. Root. She died in Stamford, CT in 1896.

=== Beekeeping ===
He started experimenting with bees such as drilling holes in the top of hives. He found that bees would fill large boxes above the hives over those holes with honey, allowing harvesting it without damaging the hive. He did not have much knowledge in the beginning but through careful scientific observation, an open mind, and time, he was able to become an expert beekeeper.

In 1851 he began writing the Mysteries of Bee-Keeping Explained, which was published in 1853. It is sub-titled as Being a Complete Analysis of the Whole Subject: Consisting of the Natural History of Bees, Directions for Obtaining the Greatest Amount of Pure Surplus Honey with the Least Possible Expense, Remedies for Losses Given, and the Science of “Luck” Fully Illustrated – the Result of More Than Twenty Years Experience in Extensive Apiaries He shared in it his experience in beekeeping. In later editions, he also shared methods for propagating Italian bees. The same year, he publishes Mysteries of Bee Keeping Explained.

He moved to St. Johnsville, NY with his family while in his 50s until his death, both for the vegetation, but also because his sister-in-law has married John Underhill, a tanner. There he bought eight acres from Christian Klock. His homestead was on the site of the Battle of Klock's Field in 1780. He had a turning mill, orchards, and his apiary.

He partnered with their son, Thomas Underwood (also a tanner) who had become a beekeeper from 1853 to 1859 with up to 1200 colonies. Thomas invented a movable honey frame known as the Leaf or Underhill hive. He reduced the number of hives in 1862, probably due to the shortage of labor caused by the Civil War and because his business partner Thomas in 1859 left for Williamsport, PA to develop his tanning business. He focused on raising Italian bees, selling packages, and raising queens. He still produced and shipped 11 tons of honey to New York City. By 1867, he offered to ship queens through the Post Office, but soon they were banned from delivery. He continued to sell bee supplies.

In 1859, the first Italian bees (Apis mellifera ligustica) were successfully introduced to the United States. Before this date, only the European dark bee (Apis mellifera mellifera) was available. Moses Quinby was one of the first to raise this new stock.

On February 28, 1869, he wrote to Lyman C. Root from Mohawk, NY to make a 50/50 partnership offer:

Men can be trained to manage this way much easier than the others, and when Montgomery County and Herkimer County is filled with apiaries three miles apart there is a little room outside yet for more. Now if I have reasoned correctly in this matter – and my 40 years experience ought to tell me what to expect – there is the fairest chance for a future with the least labor and capital of anything of which I can conceive.

— Moses Quinby

Lyman C. Root married his daughter a few months later. Elizabeth played an important role in the operation for both her father and husband. She is responsible for the editing and almost all of the illustrations in the books published and was recognized internationally for them.

In March 1870, the Northeastern Beekeepers' Association at Albany, NY was organized. He was elected president for five years but refused re-election the year before his death in 1875. He was also the president of the North American Beekeepers' Association for one year starting in 1871.

=== Beekeeping supplies ===
Moses Quinby was a prolific inventor and innovator. Here are some of his inventions:

- New Quinby Hive: In 1868, after several years of observation, trial and error with improved and modified frames, boxes and other equipment, he invented the New Quinby hive held together with Quinby Hive Clamps. It came after two other hives he had developed: the Quinby Hive (a box-hive described in the 1853 first edition of his book) and a modified form of the Langstroth hive described in 1865.
- Quinby Bellows Smoker: In 1873, he invented the Quinby Bellows Smoker, the first modern bee smoker with bellows and improved it the following year. While he offers it for sale, he did not patent it and thus gives it to the beekeeping community.
- Curved-pointed uncapping knife: It is also believed that Quinby and Root were the first to market a curved-pointed uncapping knife used in the extraction of honey.
- Modified Langstroth Alexander Veil: He originally did not use a veil as he was unaware of their existence; he would cover the back of his head and neck with a handkerchief. He improved the model known as the Alexander.

Moses Quinby died on May 26, 1875, aged 65.

After his death in 1875, his son-in-law, Lyman C. Root, revised the book to bring it up to date and added more illustrations.

== Publications ==
- 1853: Langstroth on the Hive and the Honeybee–a Beekeeper’s Manual published in partnership with L. L. Langstroth
- 1853: Mysteries of Bee Keeping Explained
- From February 1867 to April 1875: he published 26 articles in the American Beekeeping Journal
- 1853 - May 1875: He wrote several articles and later the monthly Apiary and Bee Notes columns in American Agriculturist until his death. He also advertised his equipment, bees and book. His column was replaced by his obituary in the July 1875 issue.
- He also wrote for Country Gentleman

== Legacy ==
The April 1, 1915, edition of Gleanings in Bee Culture was dedicated to his life and teachings in beekeeping.

A little window display in the Margaret Reaney Memorial Library in St. Johnsville displays some of the artifacts of Moses Quinby.

== See also ==
- Bee smoker
- L. L. Langstroth
