= Jenter kit =

Beekeeping equipment

Jenter Kit
- A Karl Jenter kit, set-up and ready for Queen egg laying
- Classification: Beekeeping
- Used with: Hive frame
- Inventor: Karl Jenter

A Jenter kit or Karl Jenter kit is a piece of equipment used by beekeepers to raise large numbers of queen honeybees.

Rival techniques for rearing queen bees generally require grafting the honeybee larvae by hand. As such, the development of this kit by Karl Jenter is a significantly useful tool to assist in beekeeping.

== Application ==
Beekeepers once had to graft the honeybee eggs or larvae by hand, using tiny scoup-like tools and in some cases by using tools such as tweezers. This fiddly approach would frequently result in the damaging of the egg or larva that was being grafted thus halting the development into a queen bee.

The Jenter kit uses a system of plastic cups or 'cells' in which a queen bee can lay her eggs. The cells containing the eggs can then be removed from the laying box and placed into an isolated box for larval development - with no direct handling of the larvae.

As the first queen bee to hatch will kill rival hatchlings, the eggs are covered with a small plastic cage. This prevents a newly hatched queen from approaching the other eggs, and thus harming them. This allows a beekeeper to return to the hive to find a large number of newly hatched queen bees.

Within 30 days, it is possible to rear as many as 50 queens using a single Jenter kit.

Challenges with using the Jenter kit range from queens taking several days to decide to use the cups to lay in, to having to carefully observe the eggs and larvae which are hard to see due to the coloration of the cups in the kit.

== Usage ==
In modern times, the Jenter kit is in use by Western European and North American apiarists. The kit allows for Queen bees to be produced commercially to supply other beekeepers, or a beekeeper may increase their number of hives. Both uses have become increasingly important as a mechanism to maintain large numbers of bee colonies worldwide in the fight against Varroa mites and Colony collapse disorder.
