= Propolis =

Resinous mixture produced by honey bees

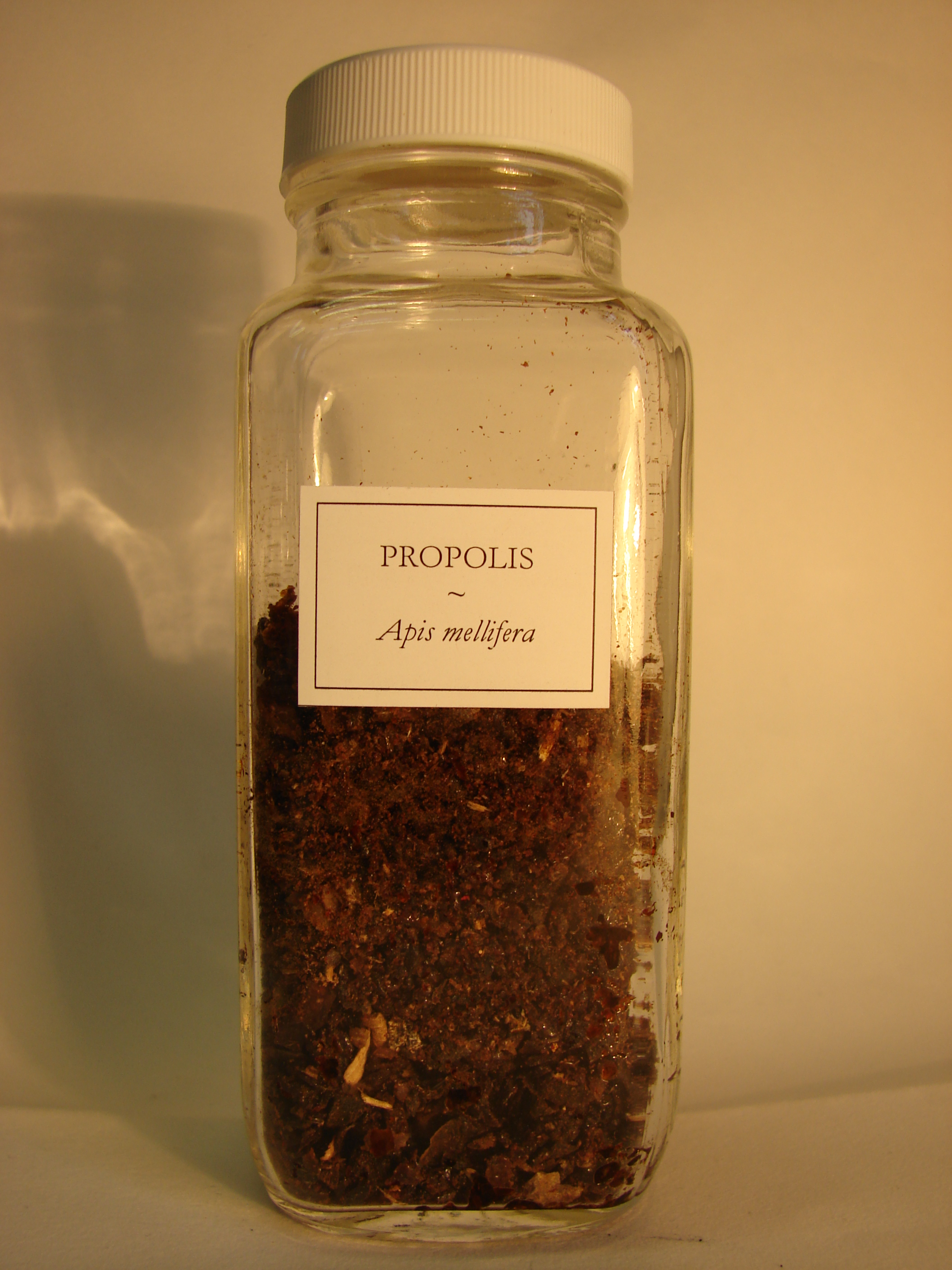
Propolis, produced by the western honey bee (Apis mellifera)

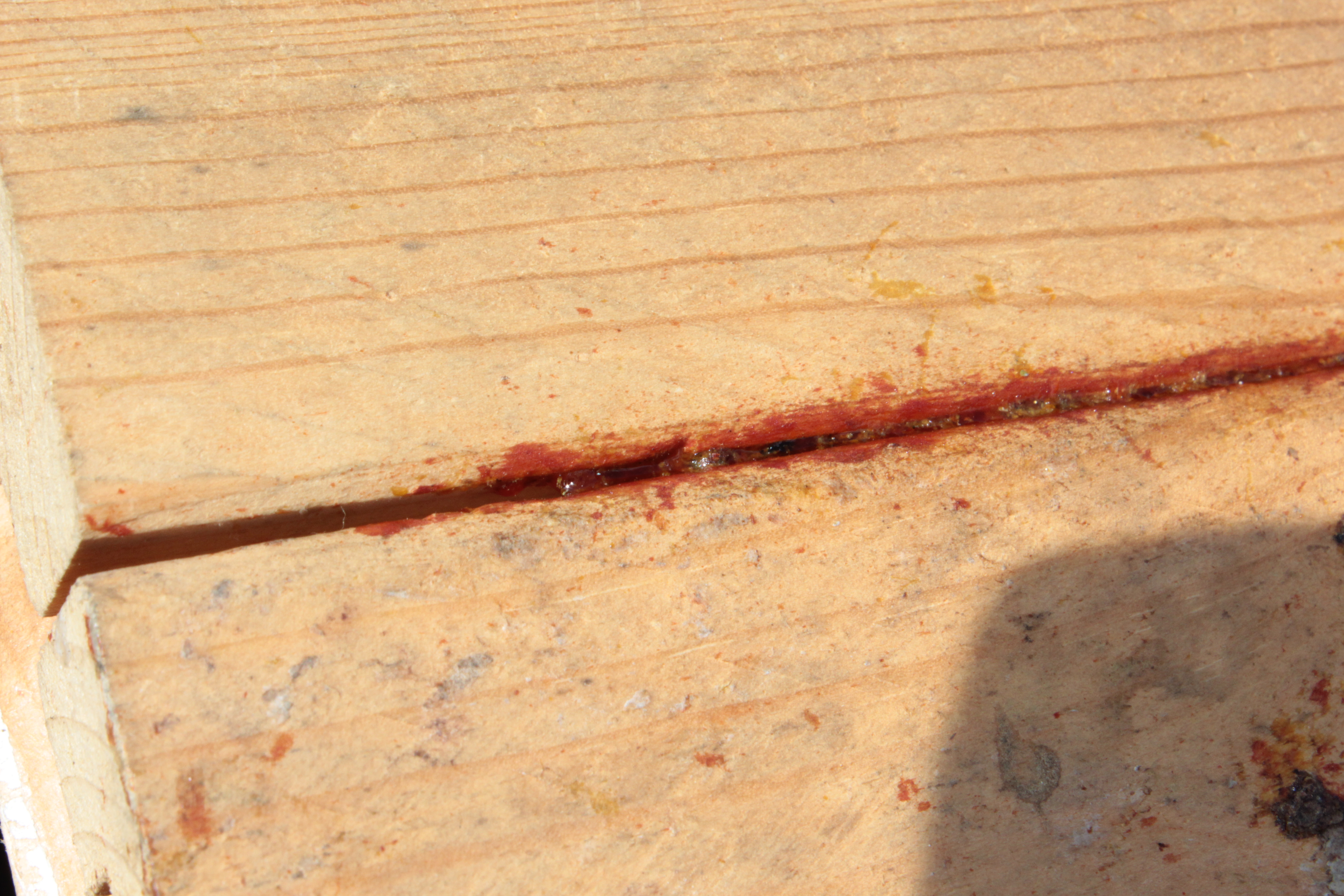
Two bars from a top bar hive that the bees have glued together using propolis. Separating the bars will take notable effort as the propolis has hardened.

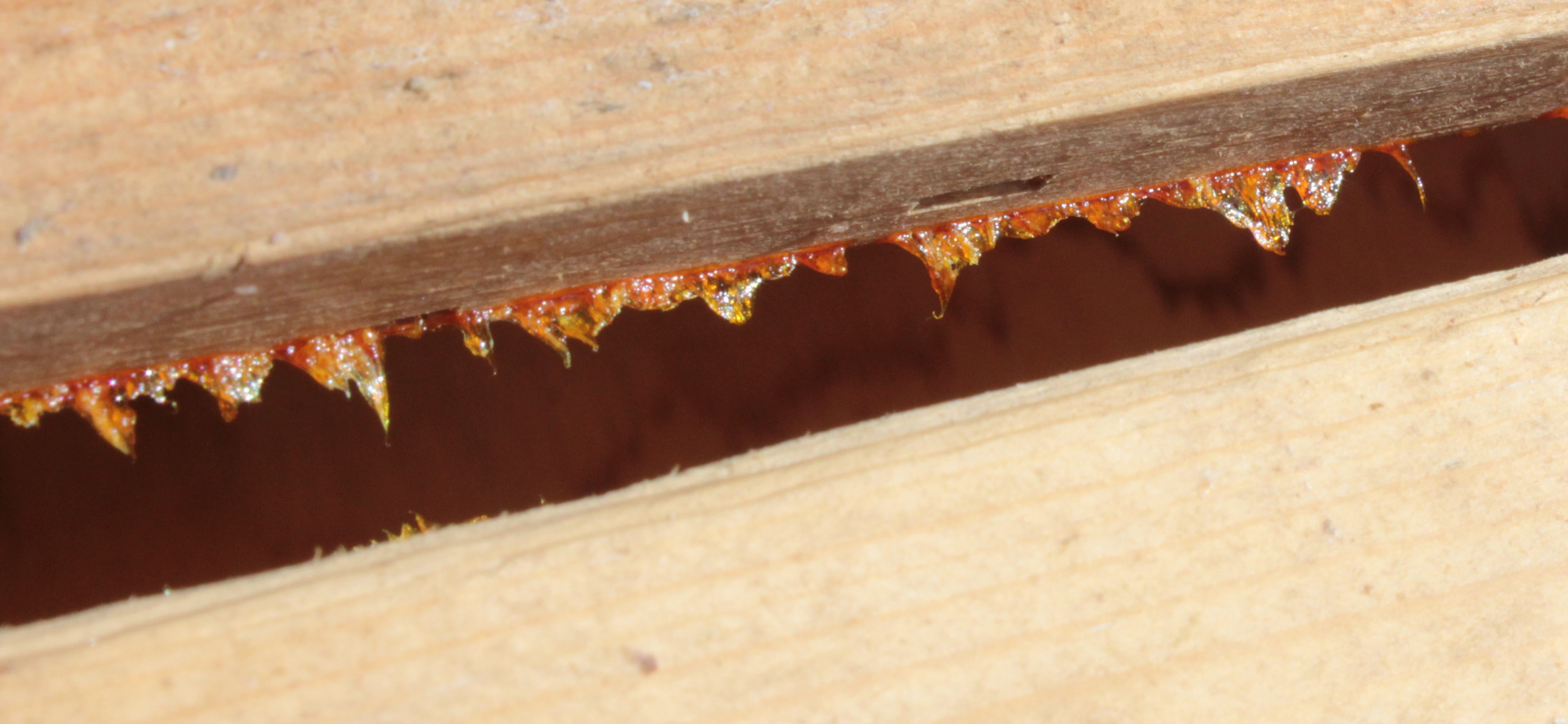
Propolis on the upper bar

Propolis or bee glue is a resinous mixture that honey bees produce by mixing saliva and beeswax with exudate gathered from tree buds, sap flows, or other botanical sources. It is used as a sealant for unwanted open spaces in the beehive. Propolis is used for small gaps (around 6 mm (1/4 in) or less), while gaps larger than the bee space (around 9 mm (3/8 in)) are usually filled with burr comb. Its color varies depending on its botanical source, with dark brown as the most common. Propolis is sticky above 19 °C (66 °F), while at lower temperatures, it becomes hard and brittle.

When foraging, worker bees primarily harvest pollen and nectar, while also collecting water and plant resin necessary for the production of propolis. The chemical composition and nature of propolis depend on environmental conditions and harvested resources.

== Types ==
Propolis types are distinguished by their botanical sources and chemical profiles. Poplar-type propolis is common in temperate regions, including Europe, North America and western Asia. Brazilian green propolis is derived principally from Baccharis dracunculifolia, while Dalbergia ecastaphyllum is a major resin source for Brazilian red propolis. Other recognized types include birch, Mediterranean and Pacific propolis.

== Function ==
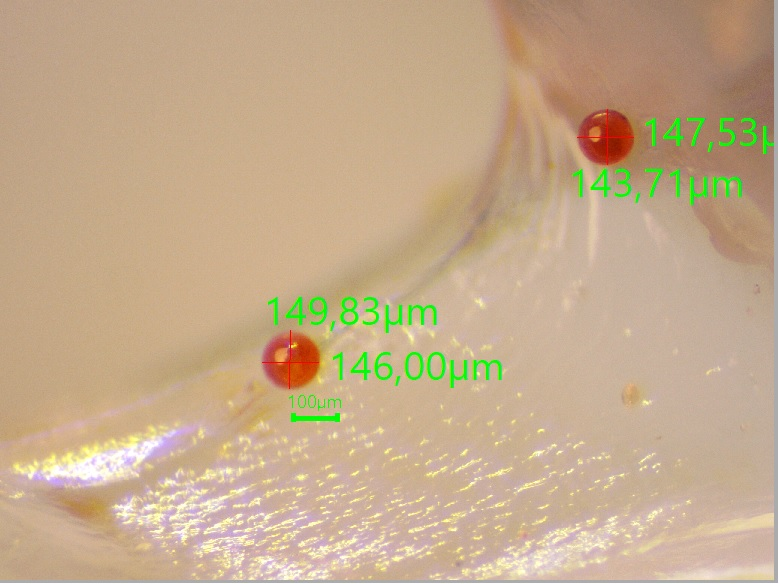
Propolis drops in red (units in micrometers)

Bees seal the beehive with propolis, which protects the colony from the elements, such as rain and cold winter drafts.

Propolis functions may include:

1. Reinforcing the structural stability and reduce vibration
2. Providing improved thermal insulation to the hive and reduce water loss
3. Make the hive more defensible against parasites and predators by narrowing the existing entrance (in wild colonies) to a single "choke point"
4. Mitigate putrefaction within the hive - bees usually carry waste out of and away from the hive, but if a small lizard or mouse, for example, finds its way into the hive and dies there, bees may be unable to carry it out through the hive entrance. In that case, they would attempt instead to seal the carcass in propolis, essentially mummifying it and making it odorless and harmless.

Honey bees also line the interior of their nests with a propolis envelope. This contributes to social immunity, the collective defenses that help protect a colony against pathogens and parasites.

== Composition ==
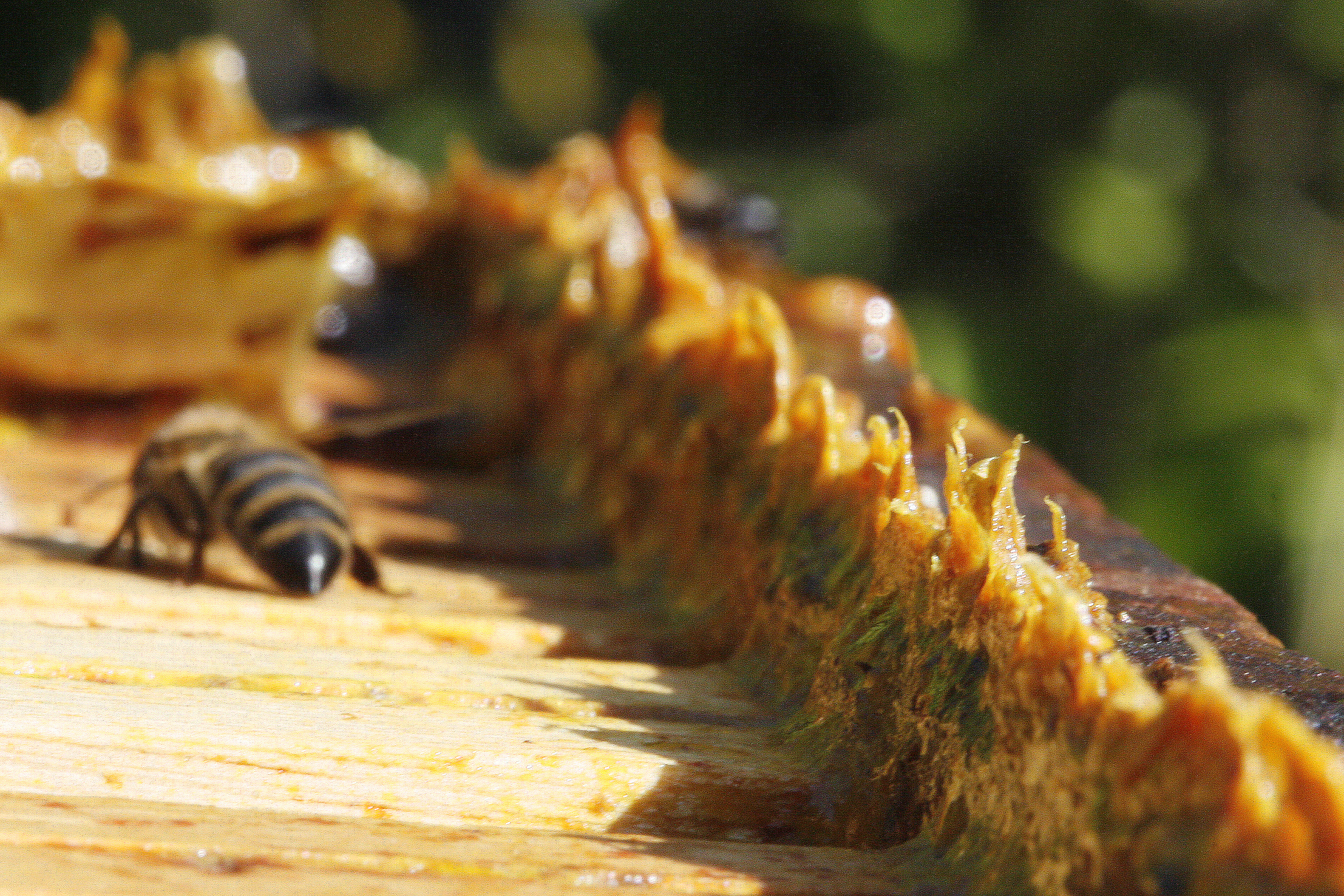
Propolis in hive

The composition of propolis varies from hive to hive, from district to district, and from season to season. Normally, it is dark brown in color, but it can be found in green, red, black, and white hues, depending on the sources of resin found in the particular hive area. Honey bees are opportunists, gathering what they need from available sources, and detailed analyses show that the chemical composition of propolis varies considerably from region to region, along with the vegetation. In northern temperate climates, for example, bees collect resins from trees, such as poplars and conifers (the biological role of resin in trees is to seal wounds and defend against bacteria, fungi, and insects). Propolis contains plant resins, beeswax, pollen and volatile compounds, in proportions that vary between samples. Hundreds of chemical constituents have been identified across different types of propolis, including flavonoids, phenolic acids and their esters, and terpenoids. Commonly quoted fixed percentages of resin, wax, pollen and essential oils have been criticized as unsubstantiated. An analysis of propolis from Henan, China, found sinapinic acid, isoferulic acid, caffeic acid, and chrysin.

In neotropical regions, in addition to a large variety of trees, bees may also gather resin from flowers in the genera Clusia and Dalechampia, which are the only known plant genera that produce floral resins to attract pollinators. Clusia resin contains polyprenylated benzophenones. In some areas of Chile and Argentina Andean valleys, propolis contains viscidone, a terpene from Baccharis shrubs, and prenylated acids, such as 4-hydroxy-3,5-diprenyl cinnamic acid.

Overall, flavonoids, phenolic acids, and phenolic aldehydes are common constituents, while coumarins, stilbenes, and lignans are less common.

== Uses ==
=== Traditional medicine and clinical research ===
Propolis has been used in traditional medicine and investigated in clinical studies, but evidence of therapeutic benefit remains limited. Differences in the composition of propolis preparations complicate comparisons between studies.

A 2026 systematic review of 45 randomized clinical trials found that propolis-containing preparations may reduce dental plaque and oral microbial counts, but rated the certainty of the evidence as very low. Direct evidence that these preparations prevent dental caries was insufficient.

Propolis preparations have also been studied for oral mucositis associated with cancer treatment. A 2026 review reported possible benefits, while identifying small sample sizes, problems with blinding, and differences in formulations as limitations of the evidence.

A 2026 meta-analysis of 20 randomized trials in adults with metabolic risk factors found reductions in fasting blood glucose and triglyceride levels, but no statistically significant effects on blood pressure, waist circumference or HDL cholesterol. The authors highlighted limited standardization of the preparations, heterogeneity in some outcomes and the need to establish long-term effects.

=== Musical instruments ===
Propolis is used by some string-instrument makers (violin, viola, cello, and bass) as a varnish ingredient. A tincture of propolis may be used to seal the surface of newly made violin family bridges, and may be used in the maintenance of the bores of pan flute tubes. Claims that Antonio Stradivari used propolis in the varnish of his instruments were disproven in 2009.

== Adverse effects ==
Propolis can cause allergic contact dermatitis. Reported reactions to topical propolis products include cheilitis, lip swelling and inflammation of the surrounding skin.
