= Seitingen-Oberflacht =

- Municipality
- Coat of arms

- Location of Seitingen-Oberflacht within Tuttlingen district
- Interactive map of Seitingen-Oberflacht
- Location within Germany Location within Baden-Württemberg
- Coordinates: 48°01′08″N 08°43′33″E
- Country: Germany
- State: Baden-Württemberg
- Admin. region: Freiburg
- District: Tuttlingen

Government
  - Mayor (2018–26): Jürgen Buhl

Area
  - Total: 19.66 km^{2} (7.59 sq mi)
- Elevation: 728 m (2,388 ft)

Population (2025-12-31)
  - Total: 2,519
  - Density: 128.1/km^{2} (331.9/sq mi)
- Time zone: UTC+01:00 (CET)
  - Summer (DST): UTC+02:00 (CEST)
- Postal codes: 78606
- Dialling codes: 07464
- Vehicle registration: TUT
- Website: www.seitingen-oberflacht.de

Seitingen-Oberflacht is a municipality in the district of Tuttlingen in Baden-Württemberg in Germany.
