= Slumgum =

Beeswax residue

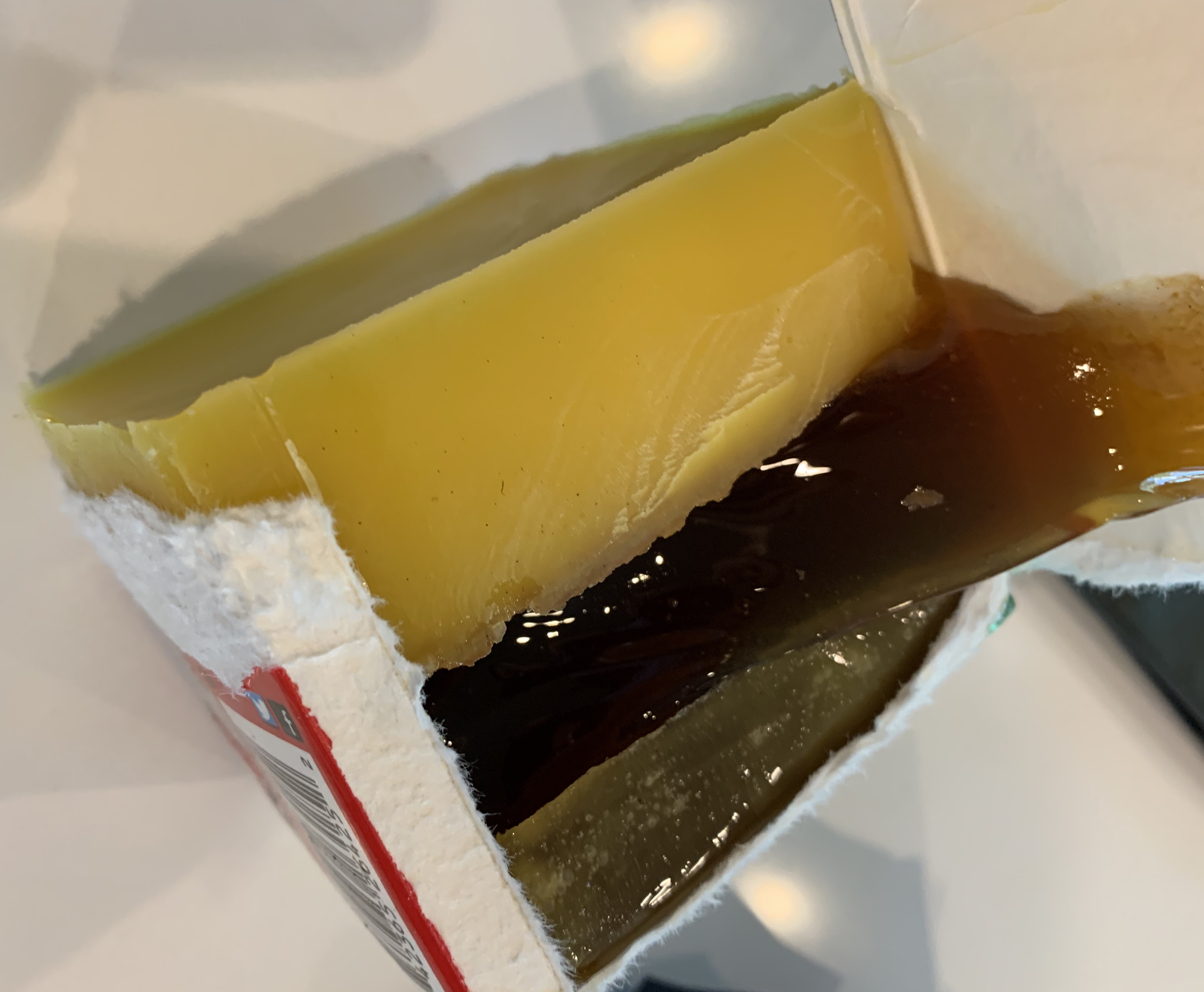
Elements that result from melting beehive wax - from bottom: slumgum, honey, beeswax

Slumgum in beekeeping is the residue of the beeswax rendering process.

When the beeswax from brood comb is rendered to produce clean wax, it leaves behind the pupa casings, skins shed by molting larvae, excrement from larvae, wax moth cocoons, and other residual debris included in the original material.

== Uses ==
Less slumgum can be expected from rendering of cappings or honey comb. Slumgum is slightly heavier than wax and sticks to the bottom of the wax cake. It is brown to black in color, and burns readily. Melted slumgum can be poured over pine cones to make fire starters.

Lumps of slumgum are very attractive to bees, especially when heated by the sun. They can be used to attract bee swarms, and some people therefore prefer applying melted slumgum on the sides of supers.

Slumgum is also used as a fertilizer in some agricultural crops like ornamentals; it has been shown that slumgum contains several nutrients that are required for the growth of these crops.

Depending on how well the rendering was performed, slumgum may still contain a significant amount of wax that is possible to extract in larger factories using more complex equipment.
