= Bee smoker =

Device which produces smoke; used in beekeeping

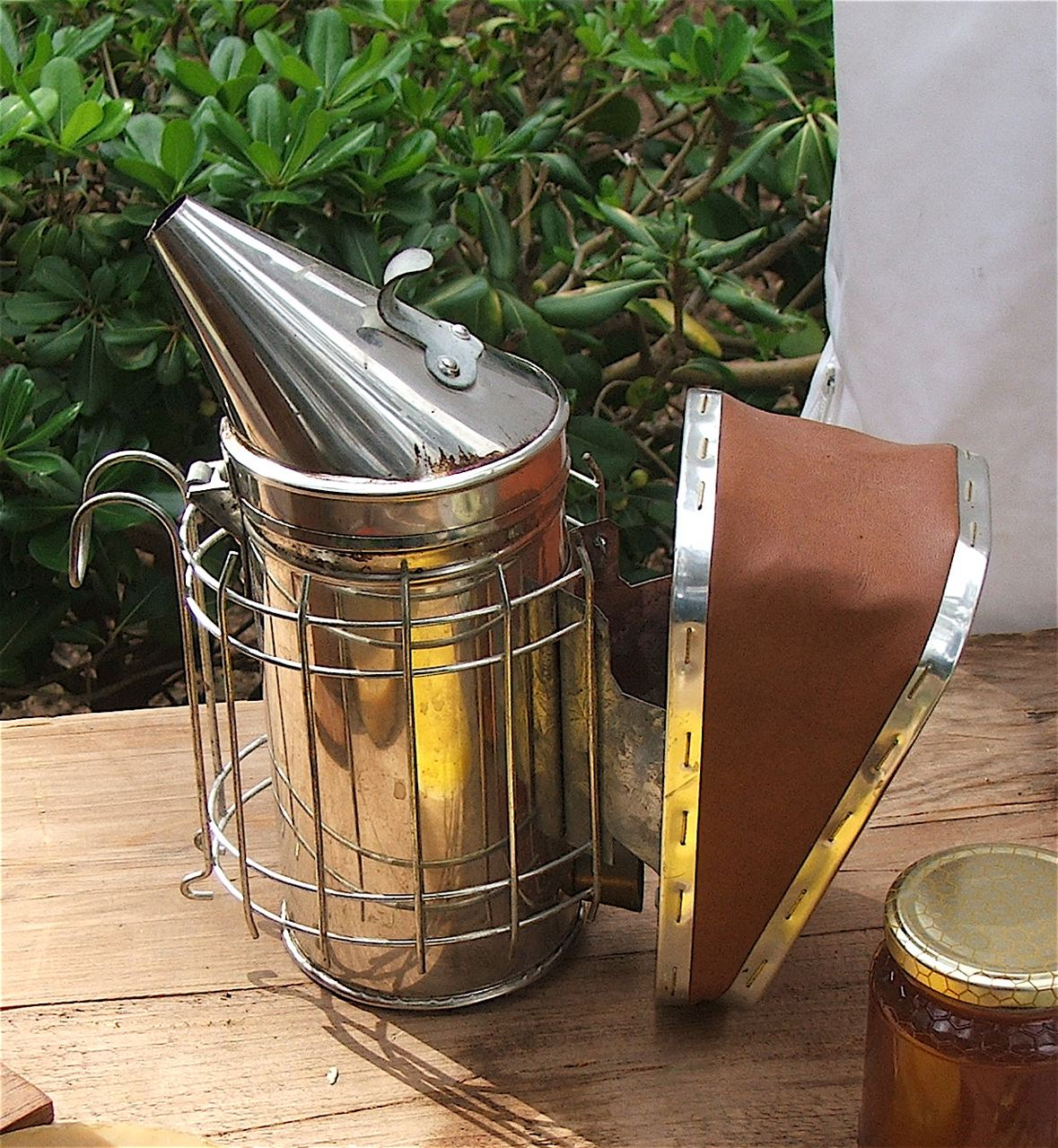
- A bee smoker with protective wire grid
- Other names: Smoker
- Classification: Bee
- Used with: Hive tool
- Inventor: Moses Quinby
- Manufacturer: various

A bee smoker (usually called simply a smoker or a smokepot) is a device used in beekeeping to calm honey bees. It is designed to generate smoke from the smoldering of various fuels, hence the name. It is commonly designed as a stainless steel cylinder with a lid that narrows to a small gap. The base of the cylinder has another small opening that is adjacent to a bellow nozzle. Pumping of the bellows forces air through the bottom opening. The cylinder may also have a wire frame around to protect hands from burning. Some smokers have a hook on the side allowing the user to hang the device on the side of a beehive for easy access during an inspection or attach it to an ALICE belt when not in use.

== History ==
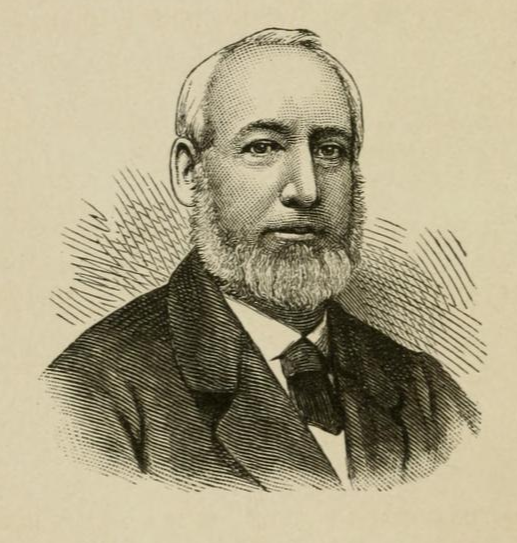
Moses Quinby

Long before the invention of the bee smoker, humans had discovered that smoke calmed bees. It is not clear when this practice started but it has been used in various parts of the world where honey is collected in the wild. For example, the indigenous Native Americans burned the common puffball fungus (Lycoperdon spp) to anesthetize the honeybees which inspired application of the smoke as a general anesthetic in 1853. Modern day Africans still use puffballs to anaesthetize fierce African honeybees when robbing honey. When burned, the characteristic smell is due to the pyrolysis of the keratin cell wall of fungi. Besides being a major fungi constituent, keratin is found in animal tissues, such as hair or feathers. Anaesthesia experiments done using smoke from pyrolysis of human hair and chicken feathers showed no difference in long-term mortality of anesthetized honeybees and non-treated bees in the same hive. Hydrogen sulphide was identified as the major combustion product that is responsible for putting the bees to sleep. Note – hydrogen sulphide is toxic to humans at high concentrations. Along the same lines, a campfire can be started in near proximity to the nest, then a smouldering stick or torch can be brought to the nest to diffuse smoke in the honeybees general vicinity. This technique is still used today in Nepal to collect wild psychotropic honey from cliff colonies.

Moses Quinby invented the modern bee smoker with a bellow attached to a tin burner in 1873 in the Mohawk Valley, New York. When combined with a wooden dowel with a handle on one end and the smoking end of a long thin rod on the other end, a short wooden stick on the end of the stick is used to blow air into the metal bowl. As part of his Quaker upbringing and belief, he did not patent any of his inventions (including the smoker) and therefore gave it to the beekeeping community. Tracy F. Bingham of Farwell, Michigan improved and patented on January 20, 1903 (US Patent # US718689A) an improved smoker based on the design of Quinby.

== Action and usage ==
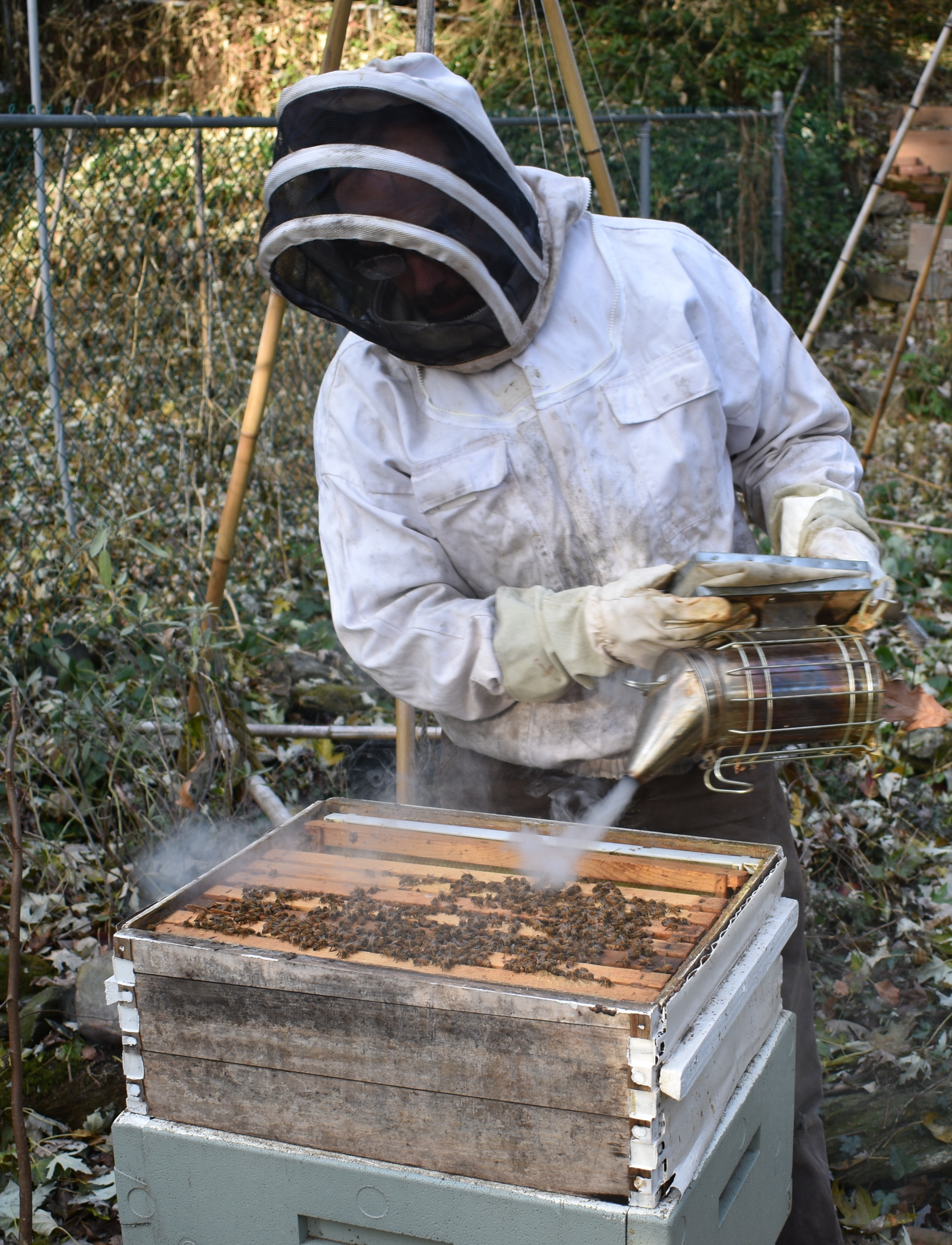
A beekeeper smoking a hive

The fact that smoke calms bees has been known since ancient times; however, the scientific explanation was unknown until the 20th century and is still not fully understood. Smoke masks alarm pheromones which include various chemicals, e.g., isopentyl acetate that are released by guard bees or bees that are injured during a beekeeper's inspection. The smoke creates an opportunity for the beekeeper to open the beehive and work while the colony's defensive response is interrupted. In addition, smoke initiates a feeding response in anticipation of possible hive abandonment due to fire.

Smoke is of limited use with a swarm, partly because swarms have no honey stores to feed on. It is usually not needed, either, since swarms tend to be less defensive as they have no home to defend, and a fresh swarm will have fed well at the hive it left behind.

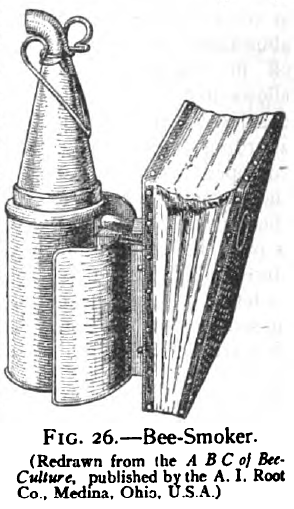
Illustration of a smoker in the Encyclopædia Britannica Eleventh Edition, 1911

== Design and operation of a traditional smoker ==
Many types of fuel can be used in a smoker. These fuels include Hessian fabric (burlap), pine needles, corrugated cardboard, paper egg cartons, and rotten wood or herbs. Some beekeeping supply sources also sell commercial fuels like pulped paper and compressed cotton. Experiments have shown that smoke from pellets of the dried female hop flower (Humulus lupulus), containing the sedative lupulin, is particularly effective.

The fuel in the smoker's burner smolders slowly due to the restriction of oxygen in the burning chamber, and each squeeze of the bellows feeds the smoldering fuel with fresh air to produce smoke.

There are many modifications to the basic original design. Since the burner can get very hot, a safety guard against burns is often placed into the second, outer can (making the smoker double wall). Alternatively, the burner can be surrounded with a protective wire cage.
