= Burr comb =

Type of honeycomb built by bees outside of a beekeeping frame

In beekeeping, in a Langstroth hive, burr comb, also known as brace comb and bridge comb, are portions of honeycomb built by the bees in other places than in the intended place in the frames. Burr comb is commonly found on the top of frames, particularly if the hive has been assembled with a void above the frames; burr comb may also be found hanging from the bottom of frames, if the frame itself is too shallow in height for the height of the hive it has been put in. Burr comb can cause problems if they join together frames on the hive which should stay separate (thus 'bridging' the gap between frames with comb).

Burr comb can be avoided or minimized by keeping the width of all internal spaces inside the hive to the "bee space" limit of 1/4 to 3/8 inch (6.4 to 9.5 mm). Care should be taken when removing burr comb, as the adult queen bee may be found on it, or the comb itself may contain brood cells, sometimes including queen brood.
