= Aqueous cream =

Light, hydrocarbon-based emollient

Aqueous Cream BP, also known as sorbolene, is a light, hydrocarbon-based emulsion, which is officially registered in the British Pharmacopoeia and categorised by the British National Formulary as a non-proprietary emollient preparation. It is used as a topical, external medicine, emollient, and general-purpose substitute for toiletries such as soap, shower gel, shaving cream, and lip salve. While sometimes thought to be a moisturiser, it is poor as such; official advice is not to prescribe the cream as a moisturiser.

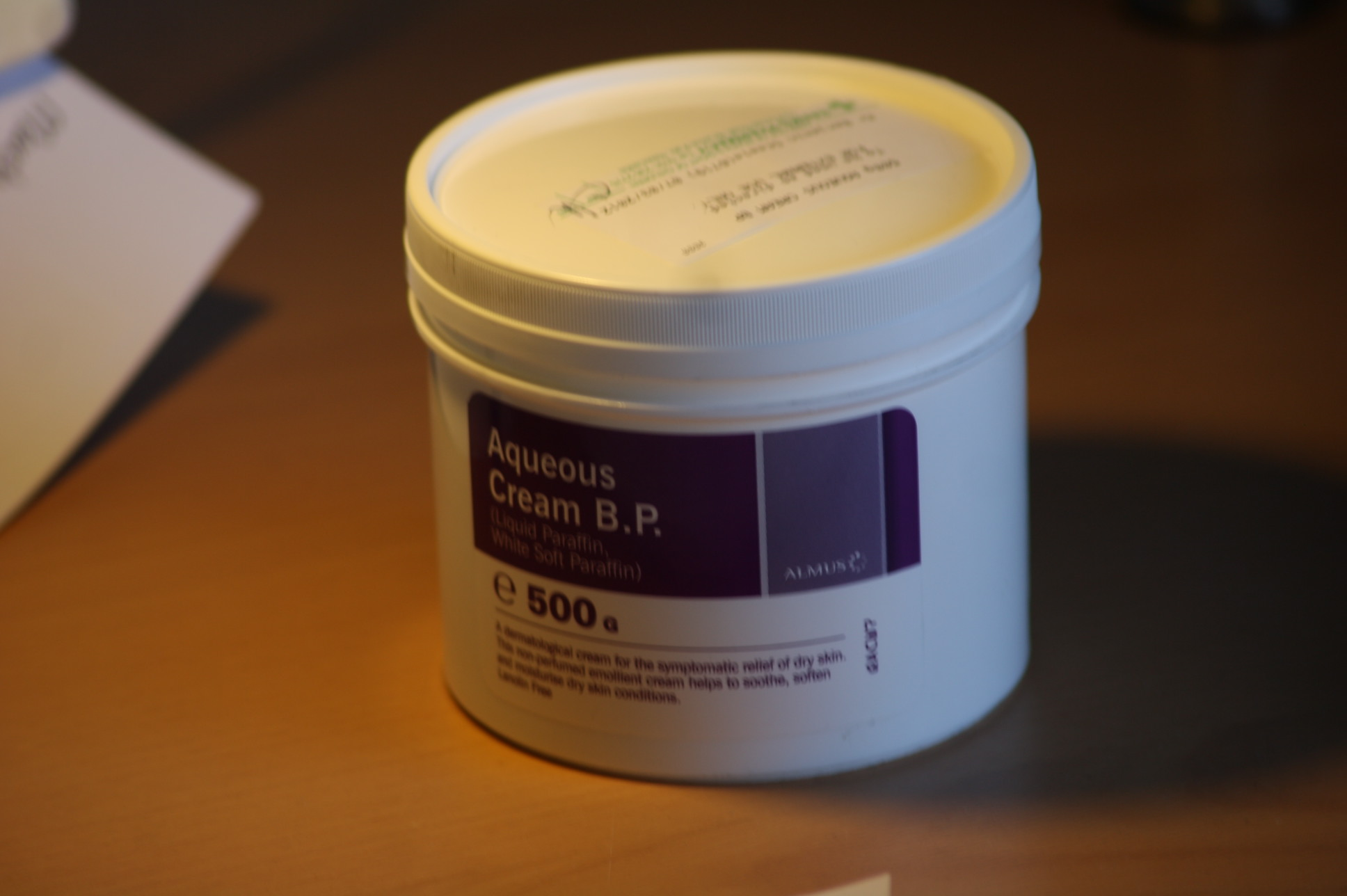
Aqueous cream B.P.

== Ingredients ==
The common ingredients are:

- liquid hydrocarbons
- white soft paraffin wax
- purified water
- emulsifying wax containing sodium lauryl sulphate, a detergent
- cetostearyl alcohol
- chlorocresol

== Contraindications ==
British researchers found evidence that using the cream to treat areas affected by eczema may actually aggravate the condition. They suggested this was due to skin-thinning effects of the detergent sodium lauryl sulfate (SLS). The National Eczema Society recommends alternatives such as white soft paraffin wax or other types of emollient; most emollients available on prescription in the UK besides aqueous cream and emulsifying ointment have been reformulated to omit SLS.
