= National Eczema Society =

UK-based charity

The National Eczema Society
- Formation: 1975
- Registration no.: England and Wales: 1009671
- Purpose: Eczema awareness, support, and research
- Headquarters: 11 Murray Street, London, NW1 9RE, UK
- Chief Executive: Andrew Proctor
- Website: https://eczema.org/

The National Eczema Society is a UK-based charity that supports those affected by eczema. It provides information around the condition, raises awareness and funds medical research.

The Society is funded through donations from the general public and companies along with membership fees.

== History ==
The National Eczema Society was founded in 1975 after a letter was published in The Guardian by Christine Orton who described her child's struggle with eczema. In the letter, Christine proposed that "we should form a society for sufferers and their relatives", which received hundreds of letters in support. The Guardian followed up with an article called "the soothing success story of the campaign that started from scratch" in 1976, which reported the launch of the National Eczema Society.

== Information, advice and support ==
The National Eczema Society provides information and factsheets around the different types of eczema. This includes: Dermatitis, Eczema Herpeticum, Dyshidrosis, Atopic Dermatitis, Ear Eczema, Hand Eczema, Seborrhoeic Dermatitis, Varicose Eczema, Stasis Dermitatis, Cradle Cap.

The charity offers guidance around eczema treatments, including Emollients, Topical Steroids, wet wraps, Phototherapy, Oral steroids, Immunosuppressant drugs, Biologic drugs, Janus kinase (JAK) inhibitors.

The charity also provides information around living with eczema. Topics covered include exercise and eczema, flare-ups, itching and scratching, pregnancy and eczema, relationships and eczema, skin infections and eczema, mental health and eczema, skin pigmentation and eczema, sleep and eczema.

== Research ==
The National Eczema Society funds medical research across the UK by participating in study groups, providing patient feedback for research projects, promoting surveys, supporting recruitment for clinical trials, and working with universities and companies that are developing new drug treatments.

=== Research collaborations ===
The National Eczema Society is a patient carer group stakeholder in studies conducted by the National Institute for Health and Care Excellence (NICE). These stakeholder groups are recognised as consultees by NICE and are invited to provide evidence as well as nominate clinical, patient, and commissioning experts. The charity has contributed to discussions on newly developed therapies, including Lebrikizumab, Nemolizumab, Delocitinib. It also engaged in the appraisal processes for Abrocitinib, Tralokinumab and Upadacitinib prior to their discontinuation by NICE.

The National Eczema Society has been referenced as a supporter for a number of clinical trials, including:

- A-STAR – assessing the safety and efficiency of specific eczema medicines and examining how much these therapies cost compared to how well they work.
- BEACON trial – evaluates the effectiveness, safety, and cost of key treatments for adults with moderate to severe eczema
- BIOMAP - research into the underlying causes of atopic dermatitis and psoriasis
- ECO trial – website providing a range of advice and support around eczema management and treatments
- END-ITCH study - study into the effectiveness of the "combined approach" for managing eczema
- Global Patient Initiative for Optimal Eczema Care - a global patient-led organisation that measures and improves eczema care
- Kids in Control study - helping children take control of their eczema by increasing their understanding of the condition
- Navigating Primary Care with Topical Steroid Withdrawal - study into the lived experience of those with Topical Steroid Withdrawal
- RAPID Eczema Trials Programme - studies that aim to answer key questions from those affected by eczema
- SLEEP study - this project aims to better understand and manage sleep disturbances caused by eczema
- TECH study - UK-wide online patient and parent survey to explore experiences of eczema teleconsultations
- TRANS-FOODS study - study which aims to reduce the risk of babies developing peanut allergy through skin contact, which is more common in babies with eczema

=== Support for researchers ===
The National Eczema Society provides grants to support research into the causes of eczema and possible treatment options.

In 2024/25, the Society launched its first research grant call which invited UK researchers to apply for a fully-funded PhD Studentship as well as innovation grants up to £10K and pump priming grants up to £30K. In 2025, the charity announced that they have awarded the grants to fund 4 research projects this includes:

- PhD Studentship Award – Talking about Topical Steroid Withdrawal in Healthcare Consultations Dr Paul Leighton, Dr Laura Howells and Dr Lydia Tutt, University of Nottingham This PhD studentship will explore how patients and healthcare professionals communicate about Topical Steroid Withdrawal (TSW).
- PhD Studentship Award - Evaluating Effects of Sunlight and Other Environmental Exposures in Atopic Dermatitis Dr Kirsty Rutter and Dr Zenas Yiu, University of Manchester & Salford Care Organisation. This research investigates how sunlight and other environmental factors affect eczema symptoms.
- Pump-priming Grant Award - The Lived Experiences of Women with Atopic Dermatitis Prof Carsten Flohr – St John’s Institute of Dermatology, King’s College London, Prof Dr Christian Apfelbacher, Prof Catherine Nelson-Piercy, Prof Christian Vestergaard, Dr Helen Yannakoudakis, Stephen Barlow, Dr Ruchika Kumari, Dr Alphonsus Yip, Dr Suzanne Keddie and Sarah Mewett, Patient Expert. This study explores the challenges women with eczema face, especially around pregnancy and reproductive health.
- Pump-Priming Grant Award - Scratching the Surface: Investigating the Scale and Molecular Mechanisms of Topical Steroid Withdrawal Dr Alice Burleigh and Prof Sara Brown, University of Edinburgh. The research aims to improve understanding of how Topical Steroid Withdrawal develops and inform future approaches to diagnosis and treatment.

== Leadership ==
Andrew Proctor has been the Chief Executive of The National Eczema Society since March 2018.

The Society is governed by a council of trustees, compromising of 6 members:

- Stephen Pugh (Chair)
- James Pitayanukul (Treasurer)
- Hannah Kunzlik
- Professor Celia Moss OBE
- Hedwig Vollers
- Suzanne Watson

The charity also has a Medical Advisory Board made up of healthcare professionals to advise on clinical and research matters. Professor Carsten Flohr who is a consultant dermatologist currently chairs the medical advisory board.

== Facts and figures ==
- The charity has a total income of £497,252 and expenditure of £477,562
- The National Eczema Society first research grants funded PhD Studentships as well as innovation grants up to £10K and pump priming grants up to £30K
- A survey conducted by the National Eczema Society revealed that 89% of adults with eczema said the condition had significantly reduced their quality of life. It also found that 75% of those surveyed had felt 'helpless', 'anxious', 'depressed', or 'socially isolated.'
- Eczema affects 1 in 5 children and 1 in 10 adults in the UK, which amounts to 8 million people.

== See also ==
- Atopic eczema
- Dermatitis
- Eczema Herpeticum
- Dyshidrosis
- Atopic Dermatitis
- Ear Eczema
- Hand Eczema
