= Diprobase =

Paraffin-based emollient

Diprobase is an emollient, specifically targeted at eczema and dermatitis. It is an occlusive emollient, meaning that it restores the layer of oil on the surface of the skin to slow water loss. This gives its tendency to make the applied area sticky.

== Ingredients ==
Diprobase contains no 'active ingredients'. It is made from a combination of liquid paraffin, white soft paraffin, and water, as well as cetomacrogol and cetostearyl alcohol as emulsifying agents, chlorocresol as an antimicrobial preservative, phosphoric acid, sodium dihydrogen phosphate, and sodium hydroxide.

== Effects ==
Dry skin results from lack of water in the outer layer of skin cells (the stratum corneum). When this layer becomes dehydrated, it loses its flexibility and becomes cracked, scaly, and sometimes itchy. The stratum corneum contains natural water-holding substances that retain water seeping up from the deeper layers of the skin, and water is also normally retained in the stratum corneum by a surface film of natural oil (sebum) and broken-down skin cells, which slow down evaporation of water from the skin surface. Diprobase works by increasing that layer of oil.

== Manufacturer ==
Diprobase is a British brand of the American pharmaceutical company Schering-Plough. Its trademark stems from the now older range of corticosteroids the company still manufactures; Diprosone and Diprosalic. The Dipro being suggestive of betamethasone dipropionate. Diprobase was originally conceived from the emollient vehicle these products had, Diprobase is purely an emollient which has no steroid component.
