= Lotion =

Skin treatment preparation

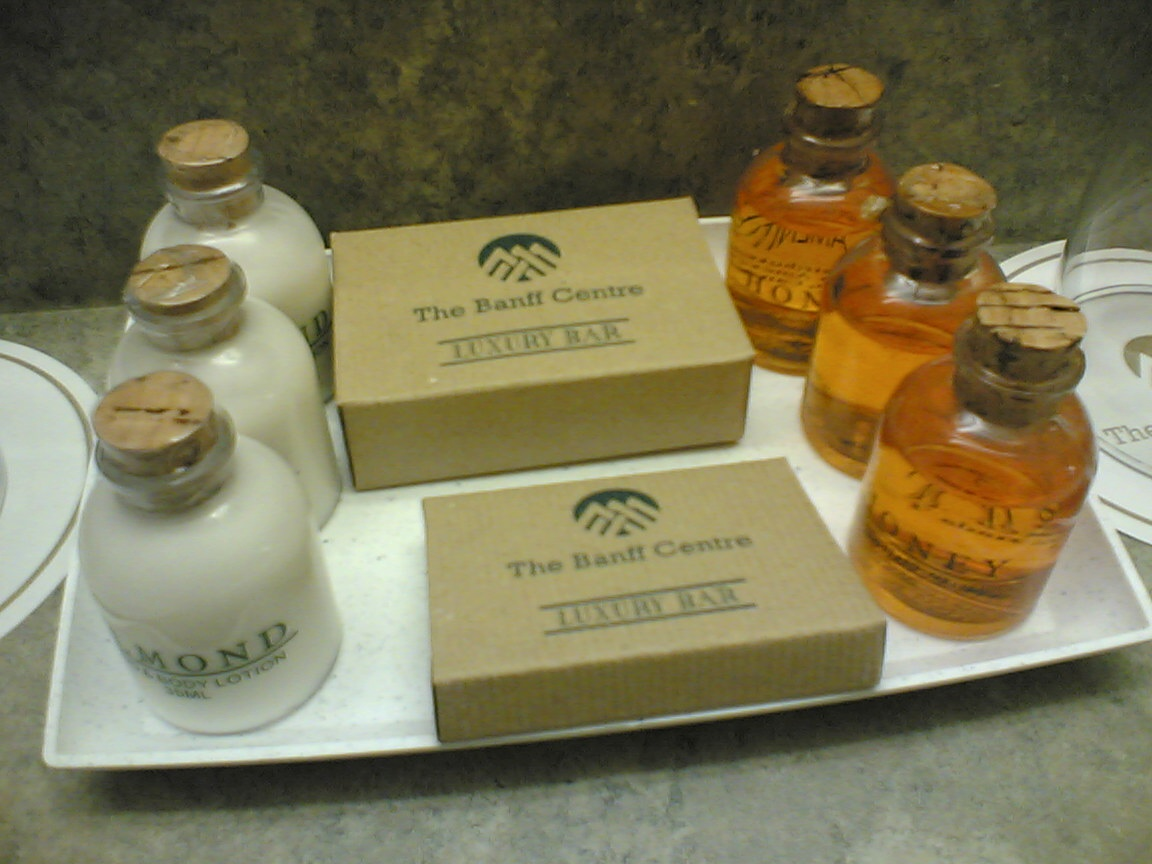
Lotion and shampoo at the Banff Centre

A Lotion is a low-viscosity topical preparation, typically an emulsion of oil and water, intended for application to skin for moisturizing, protective, cosmetic, or medicinal purposes. By contrast, creams and gels have higher viscosity, typically due to lower water content. While a lotion may be used as a way of administering medicine many lotions, especially hand lotions, body lotions and lotions for allergies are meant instead to simply smooth, moisturize, soften and sometimes, perfume the skin.

== Medicine ==
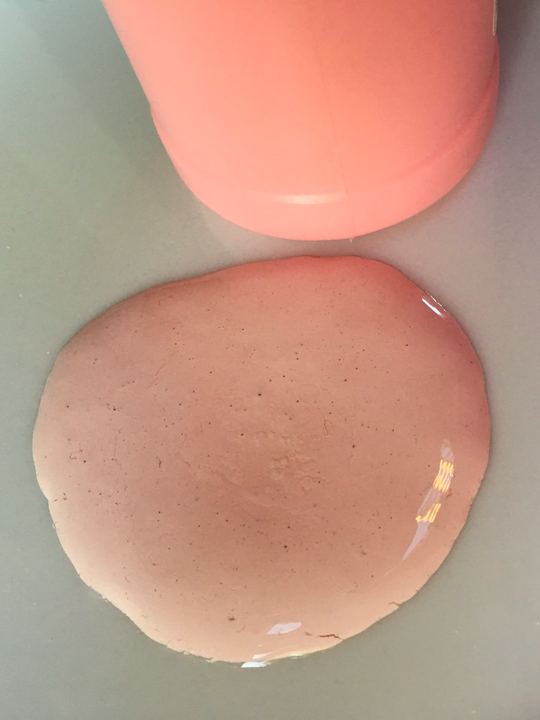
Calamine lotion is used to treat itching.

Dermatologists can prescribe lotions to treat or prevent skin diseases. It is not unusual for the same drug ingredient to be formulated into a lotion, cream, and ointment. Creams are the most convenient of the three but inappropriate for application to regions such as the scalp, while a lotion is less viscous and may be readily applied to these areas (many medicated shampoos are in fact lotions). Historically, lotions also had an advantage in that they may be spread thinly compared to a cream or ointment and may economically cover a large area of skin, but product research has steadily eroded this distinction. Non-comedogenic lotions are recommended to put on acne-prone skin.

Some medications can be administered via the skin, such as:

- Antibiotics
- Antiseptics
- Antifungals
- Corticosteroids
- Anti-acne agents
- Soothing, smoothing, moisturizing or protective agents (such as calamine)
- Anti Allergens

=== Occupational use ===
As health care workers must wash their hands frequently to prevent disease transmission, hospital-grade lotion can help to prevent skin dermatitis caused by frequent exposure to cleaning substances in the soap. A 2006 study found that applying hospital-grade lotion after hand washing reduced skin roughness and dryness. Care must be taken not to use consumer lotions in a hospital environment, as the perfumes and allergens may be a danger to those who are immunodeficient or with allergies.

== Cosmetic uses ==
Most cosmetic lotions are moisturizing lotions, although other forms, such as tanning lotion, also exist. Cosmetic lotions, including products marketed for anti-aging, often contain fragrances or other ingredients intended to modify the appearance or feel of the skin. The Food and Drug Administration voiced concern about lotions not classified as drugs that advertise anti-aging or anti-wrinkle properties.

== Production ==
Most commercial lotions are oil-in-water emulsions — where oil droplets are dispersed in water — stabilized by emulsifiers such as cetearyl alcohol. Water-in-oil lotions, in which water droplets are dispersed in oil, are also produced and have different sensory and absorption properties. The main components of a skin care lotion, cream or gel emulsion (that is mixtures of oil and water) are the aqueous and oily phases, an emulsifier to prevent separation of these two phases, and, if used, the drug substance or substances. Various other ingredients such as fragrances, glycerol, petroleum jelly, dyes, preservatives, proteins and stabilizing agents are commonly added to lotions.

Manufacturing lotions and creams can be completed in two cycles:

- Emollients and lubricants are dispersed in oil with blending and thickening agents.
- Perfume, color and preservatives are dispersed in the water cycle. Active ingredients are broken up in both cycles depending on the raw materials involved and the desired properties of the lotion or cream.

== Potential health risks ==
Lotions are generally considered safe for typical cosmetic or therapeutic use, but certain formulations or usage patterns can be associated with adverse effects, including irritation, increased absorption of active ingredients, hospitalization (if swallowed), or allergic reactions.

=== Acne ===
Depending on their composition, lotions can be comedogenic, meaning that they can result in the increased formation of comedones (clogged hair follicles). People who are prone to acne or forming comedones often prefer lotions that are designed to be non-comedogenic (not causing outbreaks).

=== Systemic absorption ===
All topical products, including lotions, can result in the percutaneous (through the skin) absorption of their ingredients. Though this has some use as a route of drug administration, it more commonly results in unintended side effects. For example, medicated lotions such as diprolene are often used with the intention of exerting only local effects, but absorption of the drug through the skin can occur to a small degree, resulting in systemic side effects such as hyperglycemia and glycosuria.

Absorption through the skin is increased when lotions are applied and then covered with an occlusive layer, when they are applied to large areas of the body, or when they are applied to damaged or broken skin.

=== Allergens ===
Lotions containing some aromas or food additives may trigger an immune reaction or even cause users to develop new allergies.

There is currently no regulation over use of the term "hypoallergenic", and even pediatric skin products with the label were found to still contain allergens. Those with eczema are especially vulnerable to an allergic reaction with lotion, as their compromised skin barrier allows preservatives to bind with and activate immune cells.

The American Academy of Allergy, Asthma, and Immunology released a warning in 2014 that natural lotion containing ingredients commonly found in food (such as goats milk, cow's milk, coconut milk, or oil) may introduce new allergies, and an allergic reaction when those foods are later consumed. A 2021 study found that "frequent skin moisturization in early life might promote the development of food allergy, most likely through transcutaneous sensitization".

== See also ==
- Barrier cream
- Cold cream
