= Cream (pharmacy) =

Preparation for application to the skin or mucous membranes

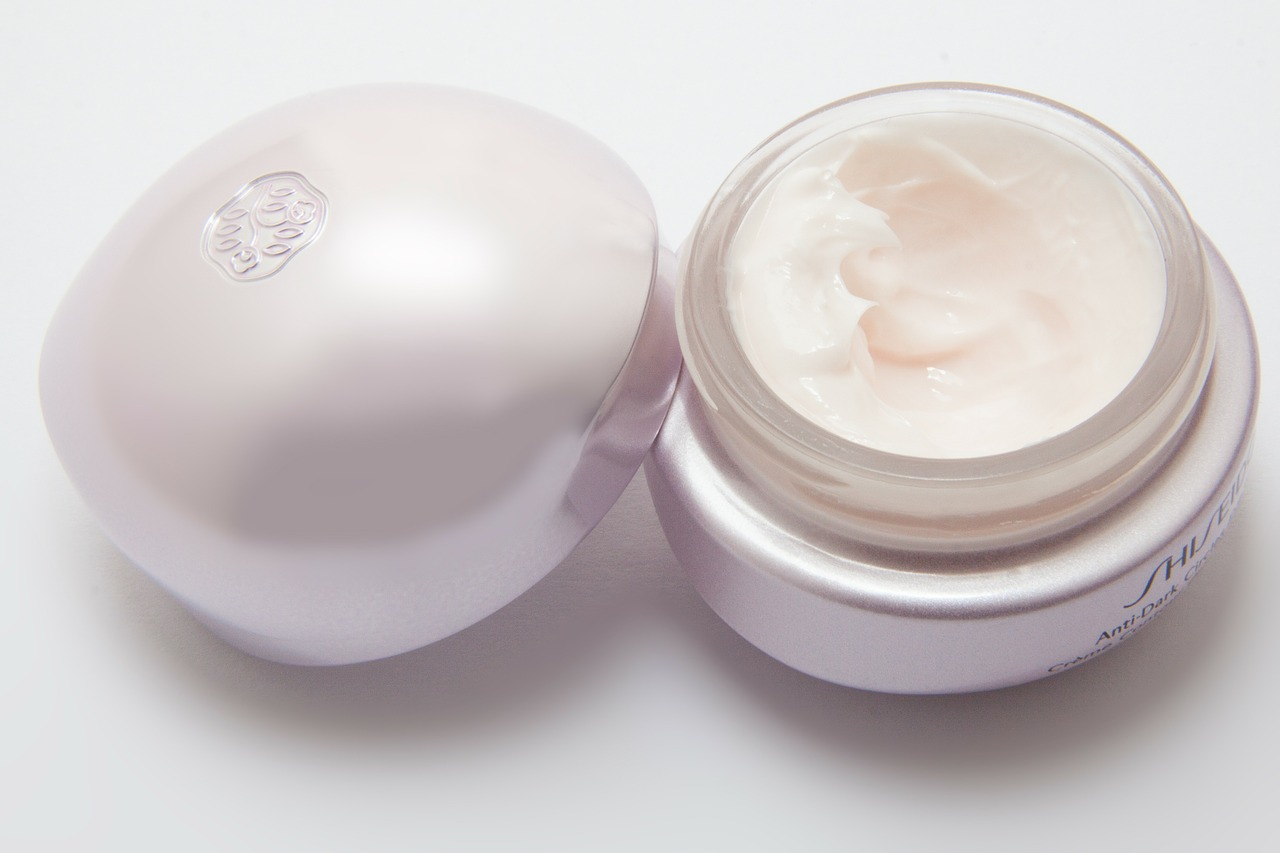
Cream

A cream is a preparation usually for application to the skin. Creams for application to mucous membranes such as those of the rectum or vagina are also used. Creams may be considered pharmaceutical products, since even cosmetic creams are manufactured using techniques developed by pharmacy and unmedicated creams are highly used in a variety of skin conditions (dermatoses). The use of the finger tip unit concept may be helpful in guiding how much topical cream is required to cover different areas.

Creams are semi-solid emulsions of oil and water. They are divided into two types: oil-in-water (O/W) creams which are composed of small droplets of oil dispersed in a continuous water phase, and water-in-oil (W/O) creams which are composed of small droplets of water dispersed in a continuous oily phase. Oil-in-water creams are more comfortable and cosmetically acceptable as they are less greasy and more easily washed off using water. Water-in-oil creams are more difficult to handle but many drugs which are incorporated into creams are hydrophobic and will be released more readily from a water-in-oil cream than an oil-in-water cream. Water-in-oil creams are also more moisturising as they provide an oily barrier which reduces water loss from the stratum corneum, the outermost layer of the skin.

== Uses ==
- The provision of a barrier to protect the skin
  - This may be a physical barrier or a chemical barrier as with sunscreens
- To aid in the retention of moisture (especially water-in-oil creams)
- Cleansing
- Emollient effects
- As a vehicle for drug substances such as local anaesthetics, anti-inflammatories (NSAIDs or corticosteroids), hormones, antibiotics, antifungals or counter-irritants.

Creams are semisolid dosage forms containing more than 20% water or volatile components and typically less than 50% hydrocarbons, waxes, or polyols as vehicles. They may also contain one or more drug substances dissolved or dispersed in a suitable cream base. This term has traditionally been applied to semisolids that possess a relatively fluid consistency formulated as either water-in-oil (e.g., cold cream) or oil-in-water (e.g., fluocinolone acetonide cream) emulsions. However, more recently the term has been restricted to products consisting of oil-in-water emulsions or aqueous microcrystalline dispersions of long-chain fatty acids or alcohols that are water washable and more cosmetically and aesthetically acceptable. Creams can be used for administering drugs via the vaginal route (e.g., Triple Sulfa vaginal cream). Creams are also used to treat sun burns.

== Composition ==
There are four main ingredients of the cold cream:

1. Water
2. Oil
3. Emulsifier
4. Thickening agent

== Topical medication forms ==
There are many types of preparations applied to a body surface, such as:

- ointments – consist of a single-phase in which solids or liquids may be dispersed. There are hydrophobic, water-emulsifying, and hydrophilic ointments.
- creams – consist of a lipophilic phase and an aqueous phase. There are lipophilic (W/O) and hydrophilic (O/W) creams, depending on the continuous phase.
- gels – consist of liquids gelled by suitable gelling agents. There are lipophilic gels (oleogels) and Hydrophilic gels (hydrogels).
- pastes – contain large proportions of solids finely dispersed in the basis.
- poultices – consist of a hydrophilic heat-retentive basis in which solids or liquids are dispersed. They are usually spread thickly on a suitable dressing and heated before application to the skin.
- topical powders – consist of solid, loose, dry particles of varying degrees of fineness.
- medicated plasters – consist of an adhesive basis spread as a uniform layer on an appropriate support made of natural or synthetic material.

== See also ==
- Lotion
- Topical medication
