= Stearyl heptanoate =

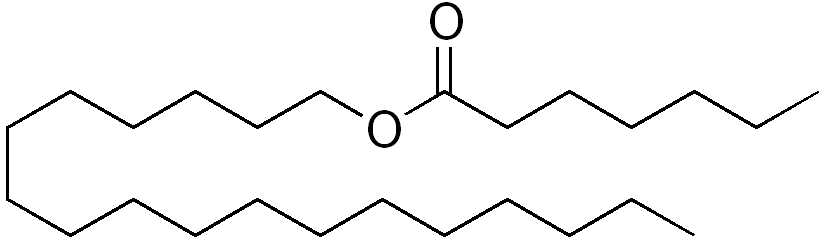

Names
- Preferred IUPAC name Octadecyl heptanoate
- Other names Tegosoft SH

Identifiers
CAS Number	66009-41-4
3D model (JSmol)	Interactive image
ChemSpider	94936
ECHA InfoCard	100.060.041
EC Number	266-065-4
PubChem CID	105242
UNII	2M4UGL1NCN
CompTox Dashboard (EPA)	DTXSID9070379
- InChI: InChI=1S/C25H50O2/c1-3-5-7-9-10-11-12-13-14-15-16-17-18-19-20-22-24-27-25(26)23-21-8-6-4-2/h3-24H2,1-2H3 Key: ABTZKZVAJTXGNN-UHFFFAOYSA-N
- SMILES: CCCCCCCCCCCCCCCCCCOC(=O)CCCCCC

Properties
Chemical formula	C_{25}H_{50}O_{2}
Molar mass	382.673 g·mol^{−1}
- Except where otherwise noted, data are given for materials in their standard state (at 25 °C [77 °F], 100 kPa). verify (what is ?) Infobox references

Stearyl heptanoate is the ester of stearyl alcohol and heptanoic acid (enanthic acid). It is used in cosmetics, including eyeliner. It is prepared from stearyl alcohol, which may be derived from animal or vegetable sources.

Stearyl heptanoate is added to cosmetics to act as an emollient.
