= Stearyl alcohol =

- Simplified structural formula

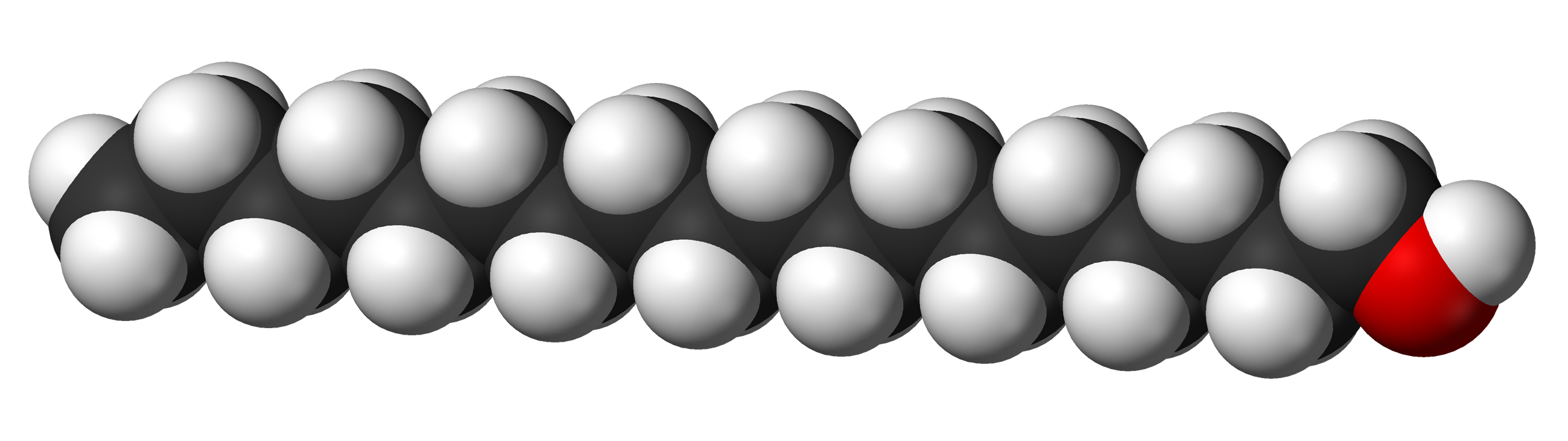

Names
- Preferred IUPAC name Octadecan-1-ol
- Other names 1-Octadecanol

Identifiers
CAS Number	112-92-5
3D model (JSmol)	Interactive image
ChEBI	CHEBI:32154
ChEMBL	ChEMBL24640
ChemSpider	7928
ECHA InfoCard	100.003.652
PubChem CID	8221
UNII	2KR89I4H1Y
CompTox Dashboard (EPA)	DTXSID8026935
- InChI: InChI=1S/C18H38O/c1-2-3-4-5-6-7-8-9-10-11-12-13-14-15-16-17-18-19/h19H,2-18H2,1H3 Key: GLDOVTGHNKAZLK-UHFFFAOYSA-N; InChI=1/C18H38O/c1-2-3-4-5-6-7-8-9-10-11-12-13-14-15-16-17-18-19/h19H,2-18H2,1H3 Key: GLDOVTGHNKAZLK-UHFFFAOYAZ
- SMILES: OCCCCCCCCCCCCCCCCCC

Properties
Chemical formula	C_{18}H_{38}O
Molar mass	270.501 g·mol^{−1}
Appearance	White solid
Density	0.812 g/cm^{3}
Melting point	59.4 to 59.8 °C (138.9 to 139.6 °F; 332.5 to 332.9 K)
Boiling point	210 °C (410 °F; 483 K) at 15 mmHg (2.0 kPa)
Solubility in water	1.1×10^{−3} mg/L

Hazards
- GHS labelling
Pictograms	(GHS07: Exclamation mark) (GHS09: Environmental hazard)
Signal word	Warning
Hazard statements	H315, H319, H400, H411, H412
Precautionary statements	P264+P265, P273, P280, P305+P351+P338, P337+P317, P391, P501
Flash point	185 °C (365 °F; 458 K)
- Except where otherwise noted, data are given for materials in their standard state (at 25 °C [77 °F], 100 kPa). verify (what is ?) Infobox references

Stearyl alcohol, or 1-octadecanol, is an organic compound classified as a saturated fatty alcohol with the formula C_{18}H_{38}O or CH_{3}(CH_{2})_{17}OH. It takes the form of white granules or flakes, which are insoluble in water. It has a wide range of uses as an ingredient in lubricants, resins, perfumes, and cosmetics. It is used as an emollient, emulsifier, and thickener in ointments, and is widely used as a hair coating in shampoos and hair conditioners. Stearyl heptanoate, the ester of stearyl alcohol and heptanoic acid (enanthic acid), is found in most cosmetic eyeliners. Stearyl alcohol has also found application as an evaporation suppressing monolayer when applied to the surface of water.

Stearyl alcohol is prepared from stearic acid or certain fats by the process of catalytic hydrogenation. It has low toxicity.
