= Topical cream formulation =

Type of medication applied to the skin

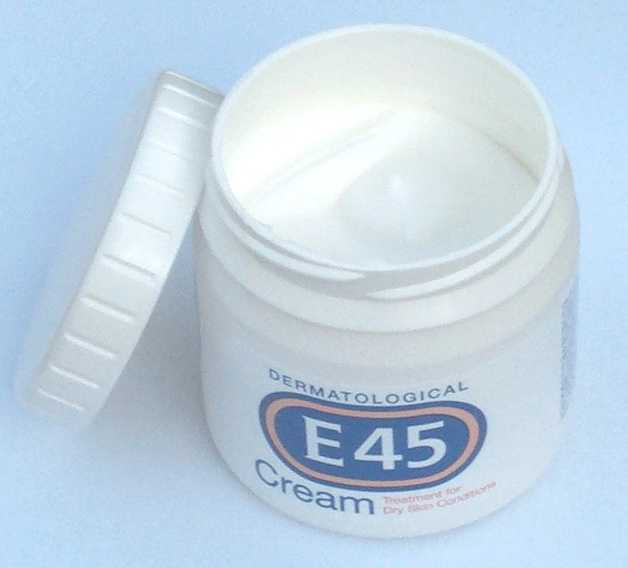
A container with cream

Topical cream formulation is an emulsion semisolid dosage form that is used for skin external application. Most of the topical cream formulations contain more than 20 per cent of water and volatiles and/or less than 50 per cent of hydrocarbons, waxes, or polyethylene glycols as the vehicle for external skin application. In a topical cream formulation, ingredients are dissolved or dispersed in either a water-in-oil (W/O) emulsion or an oil-in-water (O/W) emulsion. The topical cream formulation has a higher content of oily substance than gel, but a lower content of oily ingredient than ointment. Therefore, the viscosity of topical cream formulation lies between gel and ointment. The pharmacological effect of the topical cream formulation is confined to the skin surface or within the skin. Topical cream formulation penetrates through the skin by transcellular route, intercellular route, or trans-appendageal route. Topical cream formulation is used for a wide range of diseases and conditions, including atopic dermatitis (eczema), psoriasis, skin infection, acne, and wart. Excipients found in a topical cream formulation include thickeners, emulsifying agents, preservatives, antioxidants, and buffer agents. Steps required to manufacture a topical cream formulation include excipient dissolution, phase mixing, introduction of active substances, and homogenization of the product mixture.

== Pharmacology ==
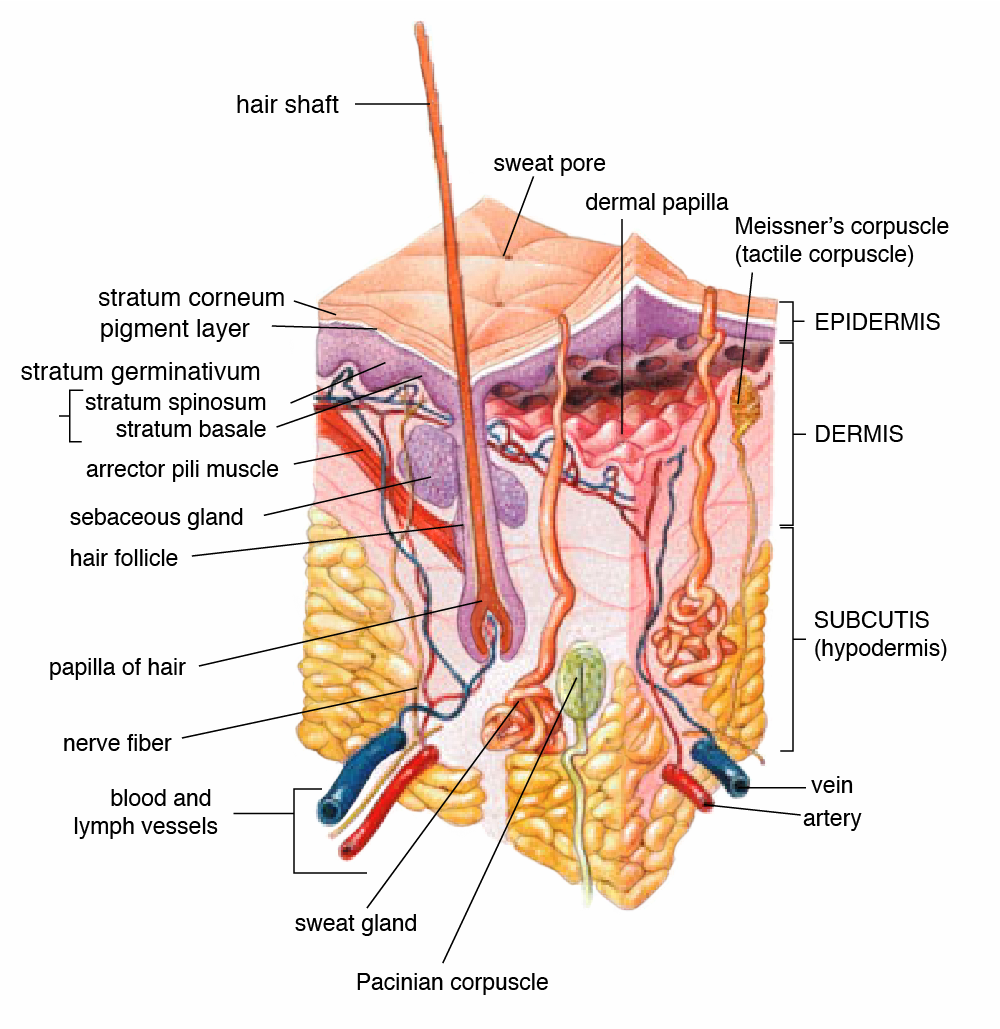
A diagram showing different skin layers

Human skin can be divided, from outside to inside, into the stratum corneum, viable epidermis, dermis, and underlying hypodermis.

=== Stratum corneum ===
The stratum corneum is typically 10–20 μm thick and consists of extracellular lipid-surrounded corneocytes. The lipophilic environment of the stratum corneum can serve as a reservoir for certain highly lipophilic molecules. Keratin found in the stratum corneum may provide great affinity with certain drugs. Both of these interactions can play a role in drug accumulation in the stratum corneum and the local drug action on skin disease.

=== Viable epidermis ===
Below the stratum corneum is the viable epidermis. The viable epidermis is usually 50–100 μm thick. It includes immunologically sensitive cells (e.g. Langerhans cells), and metabolically active cells (e.g. keratinocytes, melanocytes, merkel cells). Melanocytes are involved in melanoma pathogenesis. As a result, drugs treating melanoma need to be administered to the lower epidermis.

=== Dermis ===
The dermis lies next to the epidermis. It is a 1–2 mm layer mainly composed of fibroblasts and immune cells (e.g. dermal dendritic cells, macrophages, T cells, mast cells) in a collagen and elastic fiber extracellular matrix. These immune cells play important roles in parasitic infections, psoriasis induction, tumor progression, dermal inflammation, angiogenesis, wound healing, tissue remodeling, skin sensitization, and tolerance. Therefore, the regional accumulation of drugs in the dermis is necessary for the prevention and treatment of these local skin diseases.

The hair follicle is an invagination of epidermis cells deep into the dermis. The follicular route is critical in the topical delivery of particle-based formulations and hydrophilic, high-molecular-weight drugs. The follicular route provides benefits such as deeper penetration, prolonged residence duration, faster entry into the skin, and site-specific targeting.

=== Hypodermis ===
Beneath these layers lies the hypodermis, which is composed of adipose tissue, fascia, as well as larger lymphatic and blood vessels. For joint and muscle disease treatment, topically applied drugs such as non-steroidal anti-inflammatory drugs (NSAIDs) can penetrate the subcutaneous tissue or even deeper tissues in the hypodermis. Drugs are primarily delivered into the underlying muscle by direct penetration without prior entry into the systemic circulation to prevent unintended side effects.

=== Routes for topical drug administration ===
In general, there are three possible routes for drug administration into or across the skin. The first one is the transcellular route, where the drugs are required to pass through both lipid matrix and dead corneocytes of the stratum corneum. The second one is the intercellular route, where the drugs only have to pass through lipid domains between corneocytes. The third one is the trans-appendageal route, where the drugs are transported by hair follicles, sebaceous glands, or sweat glands.

The most common route for drug delivery into the skin is the intercellular route. Multiple steps are involved.

1. Dissolution and release from the formulation
2. Partitioning into the stratum corneum
3. Diffusion through the stratum corneum
4. Partitioning into the aqueous viable epidermis
5. Diffusion into the dermis

== Excipient ==
Excipient has a significant impact on the final product performance, manufacturability, and stability. Therefore, the selection of excipients has to be carefully considered during topical cream formulation design.

=== Oily compounds ===
In topical cream formulations, oily compounds act as active substance carriers. They also serve as skin penetration enhancers and consistency or viscosity modifiers. The oily excipients may influence cream viscosity, drug solubility, physical stability, drug release performance, and transport into the skin. Oily compounds commonly used in cream formulations include saturated and unsaturated fatty acids/fatty acid esters, hydrocarbons, and polyols.

=== Thickeners and Emulsifying agents ===
Topical cream formulations consist of the oily phase and water phase. As the two phases are immiscible, in the absence of thickeners and emulsifying agents, molecules in the topical cream formulation will form droplets. Rapid aggregation of droplets within each phase will eventually lead to phase separation. Physical stability is determined by the mitigation ability to these physical instability phenomena.

Thickeners increase cream viscosity and thus reduce dispersed droplets' mobility. They hinder the separation of phases, thereby increases the physical stability of the cream. For example, the inclusion of methylcellulose and paraffin reduces dispersed droplets' mobility in an oil-in-water emulsion and water-in-oil emulsion respectively.

Emulsifying agents can reduce the interfacial tension between the two phases, thus retards phase separation. Ionic surfactants are used in oil-in-water emulsions, whereas nonionic surfactants are used in both oil-in-water and water-in-oil formulations.

=== Preservatives and Antioxidants ===
Oils and fats used in topical cream formulations are susceptible to oxidation by atmospheric oxygen or microorganism action. The stability against oxidation can be enhanced by the introduction of antioxidants. The selection of antioxidants and their concentration can only be determined by testing their effectiveness on the final product, according to pharmacopoeial information. The efficiency of antioxidants depends on their compatibility with other excipients and oil/water partition coefficient.

Oxidations from microbiological source influence the physicochemical properties of the emulsion, resulting in color and odor changes, fat and oil hydrolysis, pH changes in the aqueous phase, or phase separation of the cream. Oil-in-water creams are more susceptible to microbial contamination. Therefore, preservatives are included to prevent any microorganism growth. Preservatives suitable for topical cream formulations must present a broad spectrum of bactericidal activity, low logP, compatibility with other excipients, stability, and effectiveness over a wide range of pH and temperatures.

=== Buffer agents ===
By buffering any potential pH change, buffer agents can provide chemical stability and ensure the physical compatibility of the topical cream formulation. They ensure that the formulation can deliver the correct amount of drug to the therapeutic application site, is free from microbial contamination, and physically unchanged since the manufacturing day. Nonetheless, buffer agents need to be carefully added to avoid undesirable effects on physical stability. For example, buffer agents may influence the rheological behavior.

== Manufacturing ==
During the production of the topical cream formulation, the first step is to dissolve excipients in the phase in which they are soluble. The initial mixing temperature of both phases should be high enough to ensure intimate liquid mixing and avoid premature solidification of the oily phase by the colder water. The aqueous phase should be warmed to a temperature slightly higher than the oily phase.

The second step is the mixing of both the aqueous phase and the oily phase by adding either the dispersed phase to the continuous phase, or the continuous phase to the dispersed phase. The effect of the addition order and the addition rate on the drug product quality should be evaluated during process development.

The third step is the introduction of the active substances into the mixture. Some active pharmaceutical ingredients can be dissolved at high temperatures but recrystallize during the cooling stage after mixing. To prevent recrystallization, the active substances can be carried to the cooled down cream base via a powder induction system or through slurry addition. The active substances are simultaneously mixed into the cream base.

The last step is the homogenization stage. Agitators, mechanical mixers, rotor stators, homogenizers, or ultrasonic devices can be employed to ensure uniform excipient dispersion and droplet size reduction. Critical variables of the homogenization equipment include time, temperature, and mechanical energy. Critical parameters must be controlled to produce products of consistent quality.

== Medical uses ==
A wide spectrum of drugs is available as topical cream formulations. Therefore, topical cream formulations are used to treat many skin diseases.

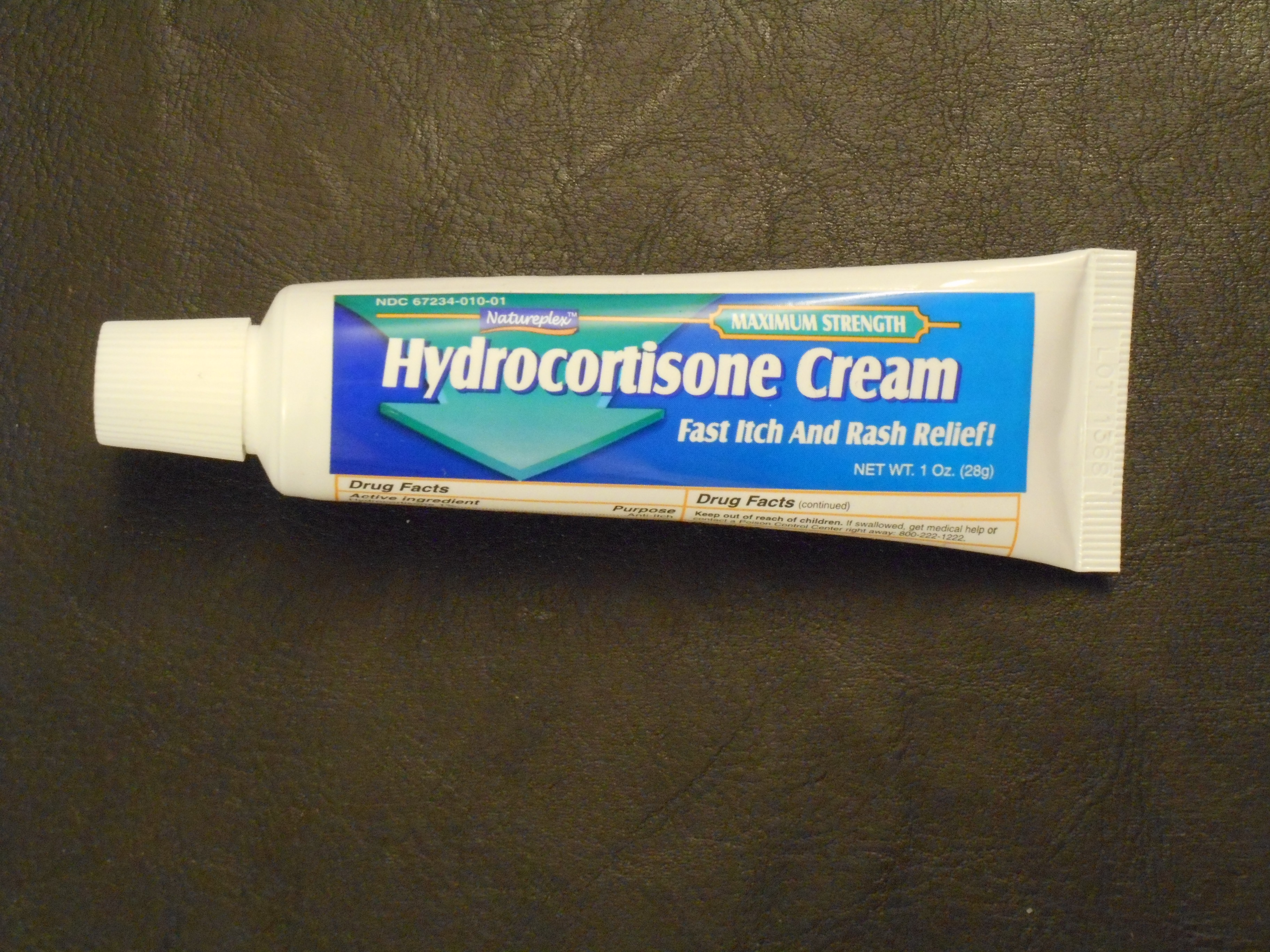
A tube of hydrocortisone cream

Drugs available as topical cream formulations and their medical uses
Drug class	Examples of drug	Applications
Glucocorticoids	Hydrocortisone	Psoriasis; Atopic dermatitis; Other inflammatory skin diseases
Retinoids	Tretinoin, Tazarotene, Adapalene	Acne; Facial wrinkling and photodamage; Psoriasis; Cutaneous Kaposi's sarcoma (alitretinoin); Cutaneous T-cell lymphoma (bexarotene)
Vitamin D Analogues	Calcipotriene	Psoriasis
Antimicrobial Agents	Azelaic acid, Erythromycin, Metronidazole	Acne and Rosacea
Antimicrobial Agents	Neomycin, Mupirocin, Silver sulfadiazine	Infection
Antiviral Agents	Acyclovir, Docosanol, Penciclovir	Orolabial herpes simplex virus; Genital herpes simplex virus, initial episode (acyclovir)
Cytotoxic, Immunosuppressant, and Immunomodulatory Agents	5-Fluorouracil	Actinic keratoses; Superficial basal cell carcinoma; Warts (off label)
Cytotoxic, Immunosuppressant, and Immunomodulatory Agents	Imiquimod	Actinic keratoses; Superficial basal cell carcinoma; Genital warts
Cytotoxic, Immunosuppressant, and Immunomodulatory Agents	Pimecrolimus	Psoriasis; Atopic dermatitis; Other inflammatory skin diseases
Targeted Immunotherapies	PDE4 inhibitors; Jak inhibitors	Psoriasis; Atopic dermatitis (off label)

== Comparison with gel and ointment ==
Cream, together with gel and ointment, are semisolid dosage forms intended for topical application. They have different appearances, advantages, disadvantages, and applications.

Definitions, properties, and areas of application for cream, gel, and ointment
	Definition	Formulation	Appearance and feel	Advantages	Disadvantages	Areas of Application
Cream	An emulsion semisolid dosage form used for external application on the skin. There are two forms of cream, including oil-in-water cream with water as the continuous phase and water-in-oil cream with oil as the continuous phase	Contains >20% water and volatiles and/or <50% of hydrocarbons, waxes, or polyethylene glycols as the intermedia	Opaque, viscous, and ranges from non-greasy to mildly greasy; tends to mostly evaporate or be absorbed when rubbed onto the skin	Moistening and emollient properties; More spreadable and less greasy than ointments	Less hydrating than ointments	Can be used in all areas; Especially effective in: Areas with dry and exudative skin conditions, especially if there is a serous exudate; Flexural and genital areas
Gel	A semisolid dosage form that contains a gelling agent to provide stiffness to the solution or colloidal dispersion. It is used for external application on the skin. A gel may contain suspense particles	Usually contains an aqueous or alcoholic vehicle and a gelling agent such as starch, cellulose derivatives, carbomers, nathan gum, colloidal silica, magnesium-aluminium silicates, aluminium or zinc soaps	Thick, non-greasy with a clear or translucent appearance in a single-phase system; provides a cooling sensation when applied to the skin	Dry as a greaseless non-occlusive film; Cosmetically elegant; Easy to apply and wash off, especially to a hair-bearing area; Non-greasy; Provide cooling sensation	Not an occlusive or emolliating vehicle; Perspiration may remove the gel; No occlusive effects and little skin hydration; May be challenging to wash off an oily gel from hair-bearing areas	Hair-bearing areas, such as the scalp; Oily areas, such as the face
Ointment	A suspension or emulsion semisolid dosage form that is used for external application on the skin	Contains <20% water and volatiles and >50% of hydrocarbons, waxes, or polyethylene glycols as the intermedia	Opaque or translucent, viscous, greasy; tends not to evaporate or be absorbed when rubbed onto the skin	Increase hydration and temperature of the skin		
