= Topical medication =

Medication applied to body surfaces

Application of mustard plaster to a person's chest

A topical medication is a medication applied to a particular place on or in the body. Most often, topical medications are applied to the skin or mucous membranes, via creams, foams, gels, lotions, or ointments. Many topical medications are epicutaneous, meaning that they are applied directly to the skin. Topical medications may also be inhalational, such as asthma medications, or applied to the surface of tissues other than the skin, such as eye drops applied to the conjunctiva, or ear drops placed in the ear, or medications applied to the surface of a tooth. The word topical derives from Greek τοπικός topikos, "of a place".

== Justification ==
Topical drug delivery is a route of administering drugs via the skin with the intent to provide therapeutic effects. This system usually provides a local effect on certain organs. In ancient times, people used herbs on wounds for relieving the inflammatory effect or as pain relievers. There are numerous dosage forms that can be used topically, including cream, ointment, lotion, patches, and other forms.

The topical use has many advantages: avoiding first pass metabolism which can increase its bioavailability, being convenient and easy to apply to a large area, being easy to terminate the medication, and avoiding gastrointestinal irritations. All these can increase patient compliance. However, there are several disadvantages to this system – causing skin irritations and symptoms like rashes and itchiness may occur. Also, only small particles can pass through the skin, which limits the choice of drugs. Since skin is the main medium of the topical drug delivery system, its conditions determine the rate of skin penetration leading to affecting the pharmacokinetics of the drug. The temperature, pH value, and dryness of the skin need to be considered. There are some novel topical drugs in the market which can utilise the system as much as possible.

This localized system provides topical therapeutic effects via skin, eyes, nose, and vagina to treat diseases. The most common usage is for local skin infections. Dermatological products have various formulations and range in consistency though the most popular dermal products are semisolid dosage forms to provide topical treatment.

== Factors affecting topical drug absorption ==
Topical drug absorption depends on two major factors – biological and physicochemical properties.

The first factor concerns body structure effects on the drugs. The degradation of drugs can be affected by the site of applications. Some studies discovered different percutaneous absorption patterns. Apart from the place, age also affects the absorption as the skin structure changes with age. The lowered collagen and broadened blood capillary networks happen with aging. These features alter the effectiveness of absorption of both hydrophilic and lipophilic substances into stratum corneum underneath the surface of the skin. The skin surface integrity can also affect the permeability of drugs such as the density of hair follicles, sweat glands or disintegrated by inflammation or dehydration.

The other factor concerns metabolism of medications on skin. When the percutaneous drug is applied on skin, it will be gradually absorbed down the skin. Normally, when the drugs are absorbed, they will be metabolised by various enzymes in our body and the amount will be lower. The exact amount delivered to the target action site determines the potency and bioavailability of the drugs. If the concentration is too low, the therapeutic effect is impeded; if the concentration is too high, drug toxicity may happen to cause side effects or even do harm to our body. For the topical drug delivery way, degradation of drugs in skin is very low compared to liver. The metabolism of drugs is mainly by metabolic enzyme cytochrome P450, and this enzyme is not active in skin. The CYP450 actively metabolized drugs can then maintain high concentration when being applied on skin. Despite CYP450 enzyme action, the partition coefficient (K) determines the activity of topical drugs. The ability of drug particles to go through the skin layer also affects the absorption of drugs. For transdermal activity, medicines with higher K value are harder to get rid of the lipid layer of skin cells. The trapped molecules then cannot penetrate into the skin. This reduces the efficacy of the transdermal drugs. The drugs target cells underneath the skin or need to diffuse into blood capillary to exert their effect. Meanwhile, the size of particles affects this transdermal process. The smaller the drug molecules, the faster the rate of penetration. Polarity of the drugs can affect this diffusion rate too. If the drug shows lower degree of ionization, it is less polar. Therefore, it can have a faster absorption rate.

== Local versus systemic effect ==
The definition of the topical route of administration sometimes states that both the application location and the pharmacodynamic effect thereof is local.

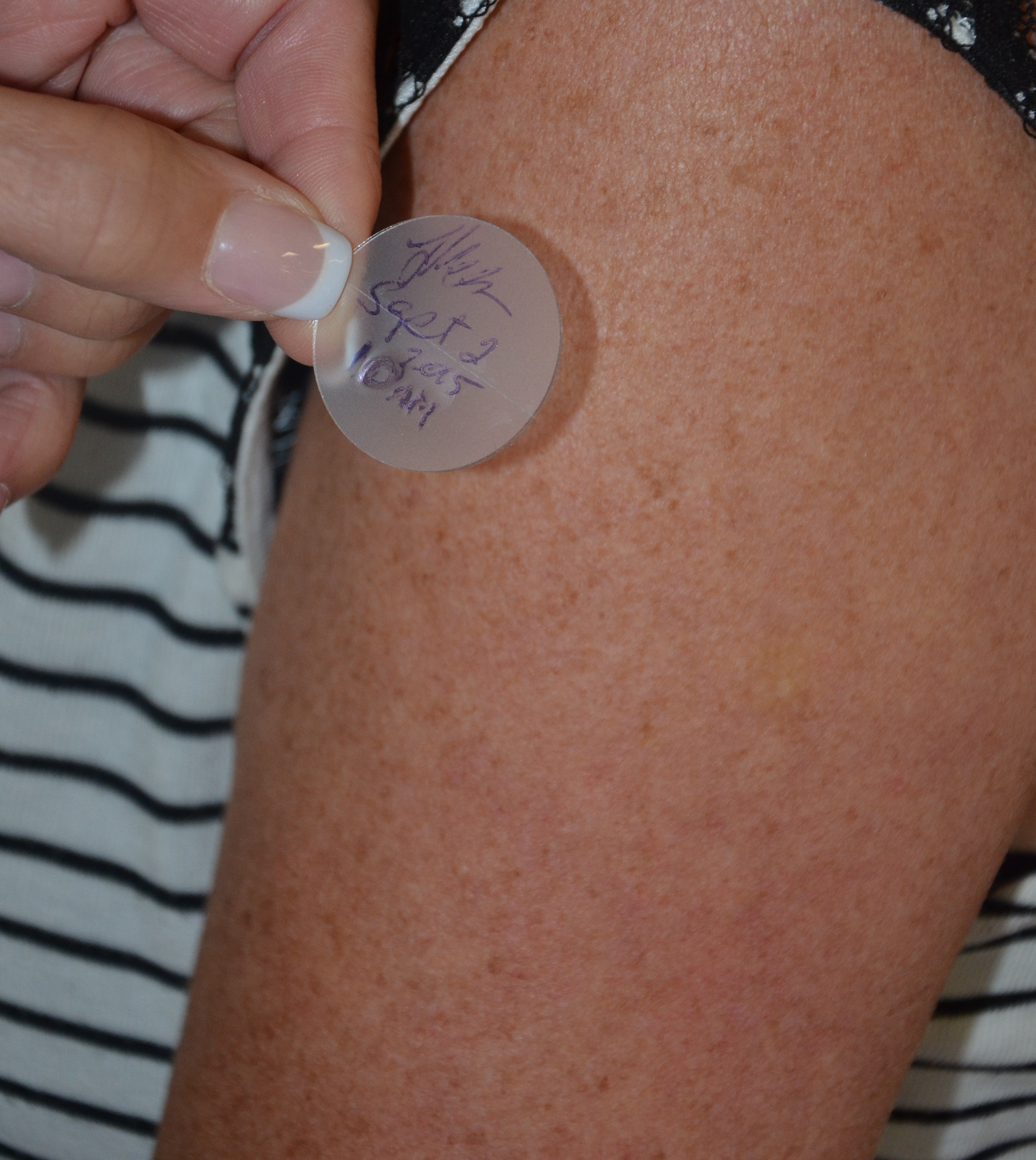
A transdermal patch containing medication is applied to the skin

In other cases, topical is defined as applied to a localized area of the body or to the surface of a body part regardless of the location of the effect. By this definition, topical administration also includes transdermal application, where the substance is administered onto the skin but is absorbed into the body to attain systemic distribution. Such medications are generally hydrophobic chemicals, such as steroid hormones. Specific types include transdermal patches which have become a popular means of administering some drugs for birth control, hormone replacement therapy, and prevention of motion sickness. One example of an antibiotic that may be applied topically is chloramphenicol.

If defined strictly as having a local effect, the topical route of administration can also include enteral administration of medications that are poorly absorbable by the gastrointestinal tract. One poorly absorbable antibiotic is vancomycin, which is recommended by mouth as a treatment for severe Clostridioides difficile colitis.

== Choice of base formulation ==
A medication's potency often is changed with its base. For example, some topical steroids will be classified one or two strengths higher when moving from cream to ointment. As a rule of thumb, an ointment base is more occlusive and will drive the medication into the skin more rapidly than a solution or cream base.

The manufacturer of each topical product has total control over the content of the base of a medication. Although containing the same active ingredients, one manufacturer's cream might be more acidic than the next, which could cause skin irritation or change its absorption rate. For example, a vaginal formulation of miconazole antifungal cream might irritate the skin less than an athlete's foot formulation of miconazole cream. These variations can, on occasion, result in different clinical outcomes, even though the active ingredient is the same. No comparative potency labeling exists to ensure equal efficacy between brands of topical steroids (percentage of oil vs water dramatically affect the potency of topical steroid). Studies have confirmed that the potency of some topical steroid products may differ according to manufacturer or brand. An example of this is the case of brand name Valisone cream and Kenalog cream in clinical studies have demonstrated significantly better vasoconstrictions than some forms of this drug produced by generic drug manufacturers. However, in a simple base like an ointment, much less variation between manufacturers is common.

In dermatology, the base of a topical medication is often as important as the medication itself. It is extremely important to receive a medication in the correct base, before applying to the skin. A pharmacist should not substitute an ointment for a cream, or vice versa, as the potency of the medication can change. Some physicians use a thick ointment to replace the waterproof barrier of the inflamed skin in the treatment of eczema, and a cream might not accomplish the same clinical intention.

== Formulations ==
There are many general classes, with no clear dividing line among similar formulations. As a result, what the manufacturer's marketing department chooses to list on the label of a topical medication might be completely different from what the form would normally be called.

=== Cream ===
A cream is an emulsion of oil and water in approximately equal proportions. It penetrates the stratum corneum outer layer of skin wall. Cream is thicker than lotion, and maintains its shape when removed from its container. It tends to be moderate in moisturizing tendency. For topical steroid products, oil-in-water emulsions are common. Creams have a significant risk of causing immunological sensitization due to preservatives and have a high rate of acceptance by patients. There is a great variation in ingredients, composition, pH, and tolerance among generic brands.

=== Foam ===
Topical corticosteroid foams are suitable for treating a range of skin conditions that respond to corticosteroids. These foams are typically simple to apply, which can lead to better patient compliance and, in turn, improve treatment results for those who favor a more convenient and cleaner topical option. Foam can be typically seen with topical steroids marketed for the scalp.

=== Gel ===
Gels are thicker than liquids. Gels are often a semisolid emulsion and sometimes use alcohol as a solvent for the active ingredient; some gels liquefy at body temperature. Gel tends to be cellulose cut with alcohol or acetone. Gels tend to be self-drying, tend to have greatly variable ingredients between brands, and carry a significant risk of inducing hypersensitivity due to fragrances and preservatives. Gel is useful for hairy areas and body folds. In applying gel one should avoid fissures in the skin, due to the stinging effect of the alcohol base. Gel enjoys a high rate of acceptance due to its cosmetic elegance.

=== Lotion ===
Lotions are similar to solution but are thicker and tend to be more emollient in nature than the solution. They are usually oil mixed with water, and more often than not have less alcohol than solution. Lotions can be drying if they contain a high amount of alcohol.

=== Ointment ===
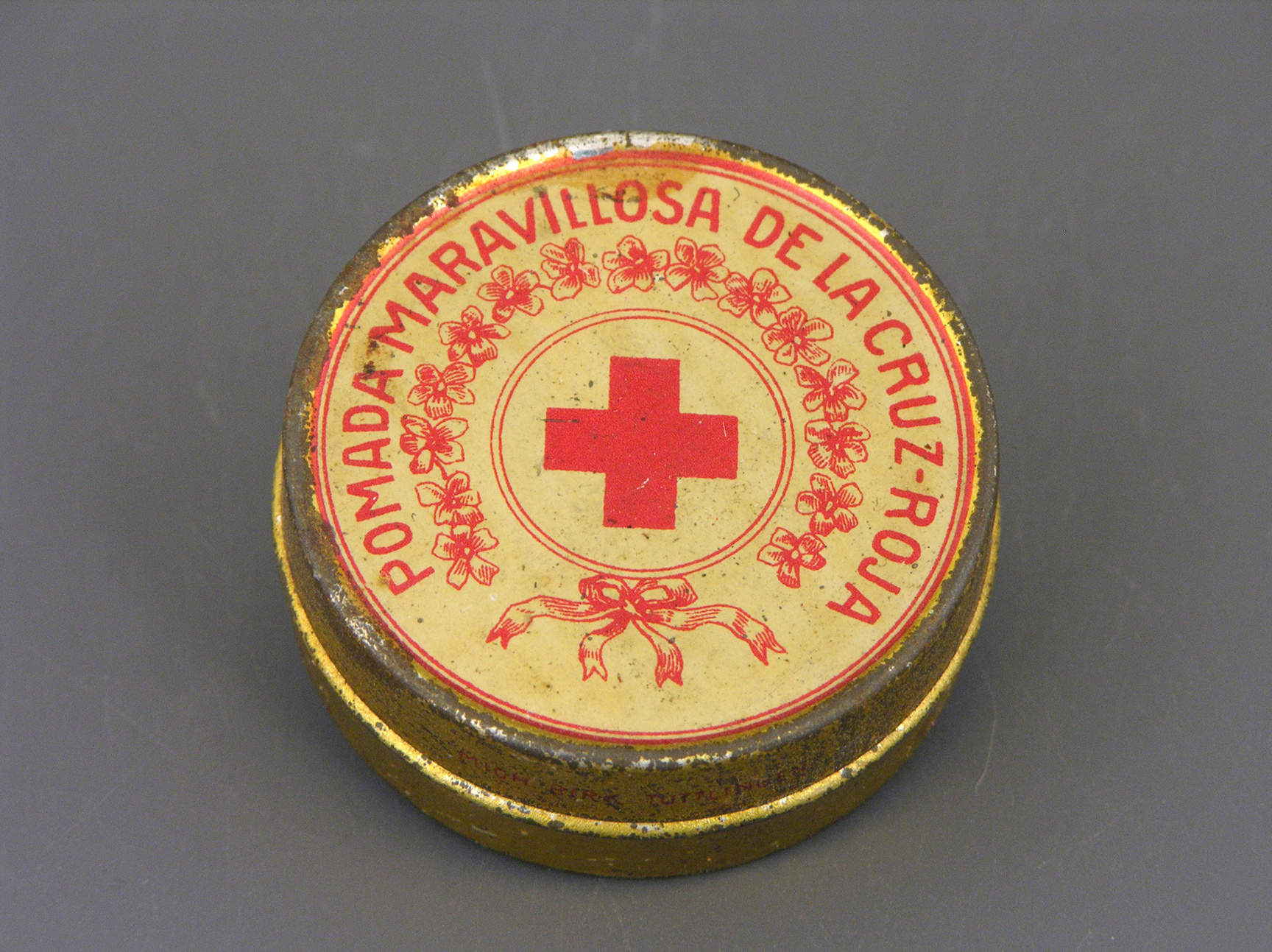
Metal case for Cruz Roja ointment from Mexico (beginning of the 20th century) from the permanent collection of the Museo del Objeto del Objeto.

An ointment is a homogeneous, viscous, semi-solid preparation; most commonly a greasy, thick water-in-oil emulsion (80% oil, 20% water) having a high viscosity, that is intended for external application to the skin or mucous membranes. Ointments have a water number that defines the maximum amount of water that they can contain. They are used as emollients or for the application of active ingredients to the skin for protective, therapeutic, or prophylactic purposes and where a degree of occlusion is desired.

Ointments are used topically on a variety of body surfaces. These include the skin and the mucous membranes of the eye (an eye ointment), chest, vulva, anus, and nose. An ointment may or may not be medicated.

Ointments are usually very moisturizing, and good for dry skin. They have a low risk of sensitization due to having few ingredients beyond the base oil or fat, and low irritation risk. There is typically little variability between brands of drugs. They are often disliked by patients due to greasiness.

The vehicle of an ointment is known as the ointment base. The choice of a base depends upon the clinical indication for the ointment. The different types of ointment bases are:

- Absorption bases, e.g., beeswax and wool fat
- Emulsifying bases, e.g., cetrimide and emulsifying wax
- Hydrocarbon bases, e.g., ceresine, microcrystalline wax, hard paraffin, and soft paraffin
- Vegetable oil bases, e.g., almond oil, coconut oil, olive oil, peanut oil, and sesame oil
- Water-soluble bases, e.g., macrogols 200, 300, 400

The water number of an ointment is the maximum quantity of water that 100g of a base can contain at 20 °C. Ointments are formulated using hydrophobic, hydrophilic, or water-emulsifying bases to provide preparations that are immiscible, miscible, or emulsifiable with skin secretions. They can also be derived from hydrocarbon (fatty), absorption, water-removable, or water-soluble bases.

Evaluation of ointments:

1. Drug content
2. Release of medicament from base
3. Medicament penetration
4. Consistency of the preparation
5. Absorption of medicament into blood stream
6. Irritant effect

Properties which affect choice of an ointment base are:

1. Stability
2. Penetrability
3. Solvent property
4. Irritant effects
5. Ease of application and removal

Methods of preparation of ointments:

- Fusion: In this method the ingredients are melted together in descending order of their melting points and stirred to ensure homogeneity.
- Trituration: In this finely subdivided insoluble medicaments are evenly distributed by grinding with a small amount of the base followed by dilution with gradually increasing amounts of the base.

=== Paste ===
Paste combines three agents – oil, water, and powder. It is an ointment in which a powder is suspended.

=== Powder ===
Powder is either the pure drug by itself (talcum powder), or is made of the drug mixed in a carrier such as corn starch or corn cob powder (Zeosorb AF – miconazole powder). Can be used as an inhaled topical (cocaine powder used in nasal surgery).

=== Shake lotion ===
A shake lotion is a mixture that separates into two or three parts over time. Frequently, an oil mixed with a water-based solution needs to be shaken into suspension before use and includes the instructions: "Shake well before use".

=== Solid ===
Medication may be placed in a solid form. Examples are deodorants, antiperspirants, astringents, and hemostatic agents. Some solids melt when they reach body temperature (e.g. rectal suppositories).

=== Sponge ===
Certain contraceptive methods rely on sponge as a carrier of liquid medicine.

=== Tape ===
Cordran tape is an example of a topical steroid applied under occlusion by tape. This increases the potency and absorption of the topical steroid and is used to treat inflammatory skin diseases, especially in difficult-to-treat areas such as fingertips, elbows, and knees.

=== Tincture ===
A tincture is a skin preparation that has a high percentage of alcohol. It would normally be used as a drug vehicle if drying of the area is desired.

=== Topical solution ===
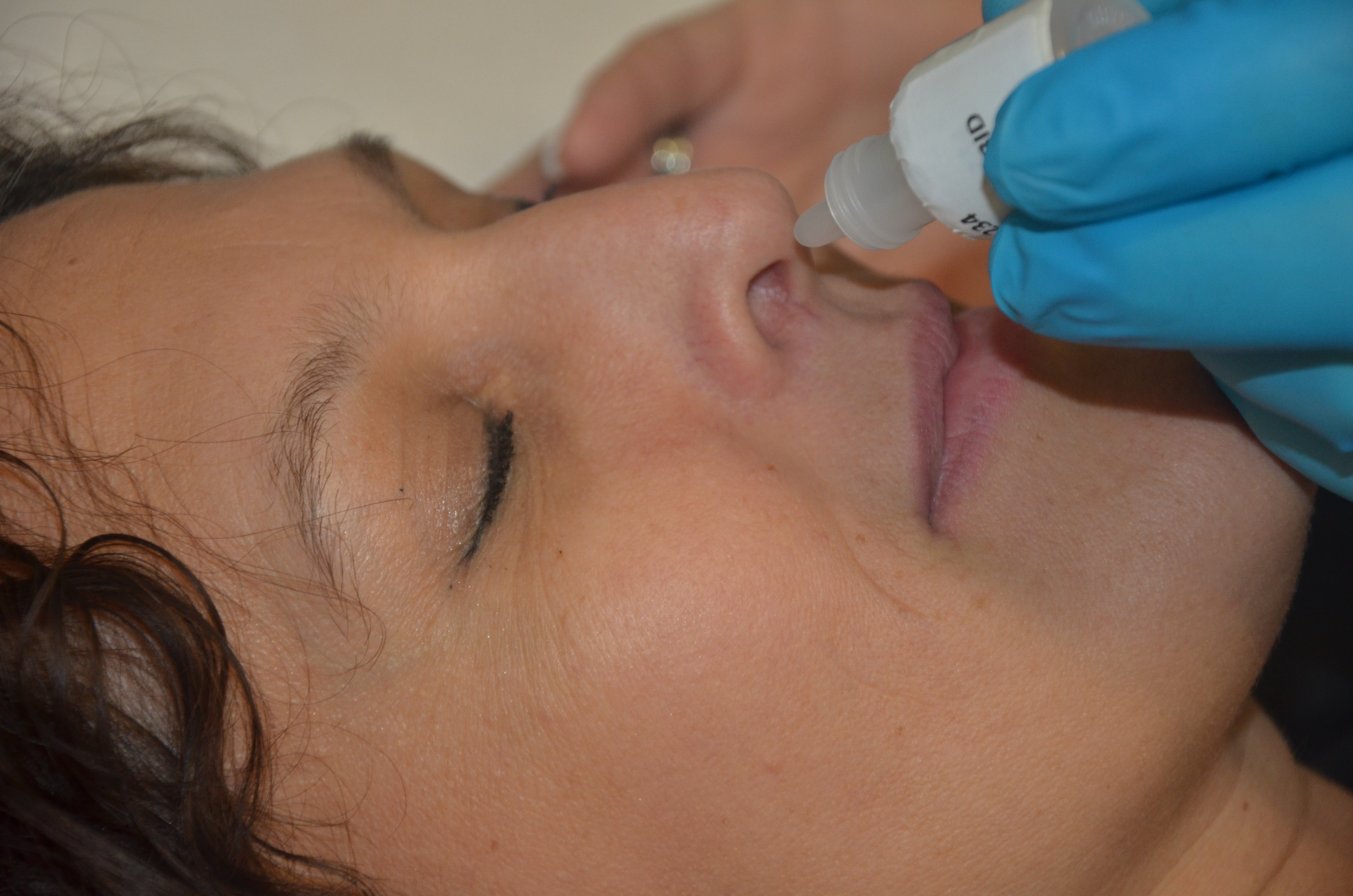
A medical professional administering nose drops

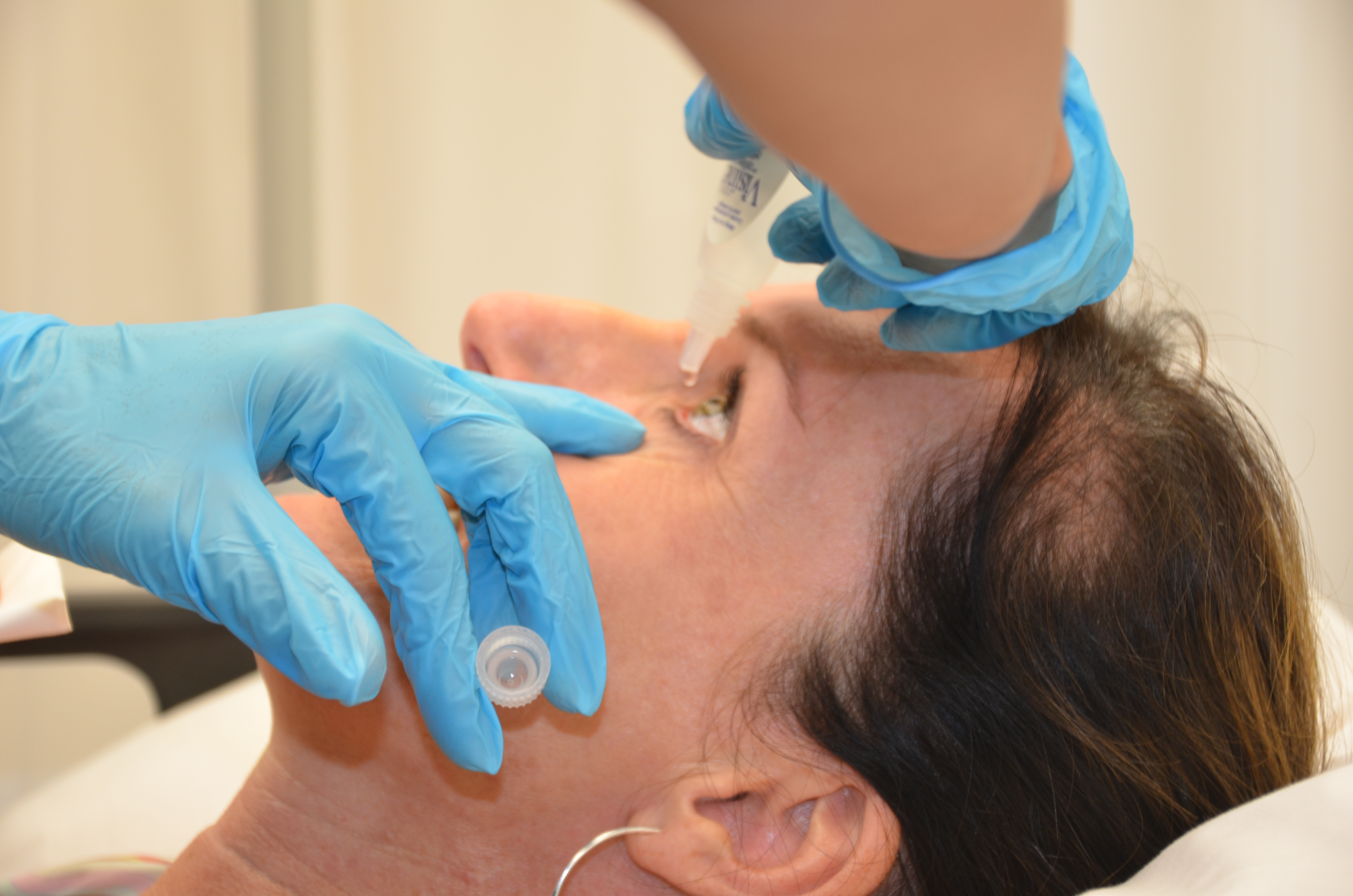
Eye drops

Topical solutions can be marketed as drops, rinses, or sprays, are generally of low viscosity, and often use alcohol or water in the base. These are usually a powder dissolved in alcohol, water, and sometimes oil; although a solution that uses alcohol as a base ingredient, as in topical steroids, can cause drying of the skin. There is significant variability among brands, and some solutions may cause irritation, depending on the preservative(s) and fragrances used in the base.

Some examples of topical solutions are given below:

1. Aluminium acetate topical solution: This is colorless, with a faint acetous odour and sweetish taste. It is applied topically as an astringent after dilution with 10-40 parts of water. This is used in many types of dermatologic creams, lotions, and pastes. Commercial premeasured and packed tablets and powders are available for this preparation.
2. Povidone iodine topical solution: This is a chemical complex of iodine with polyvinylpyrrolidone. The agent is a polymer with an average molecular weight of 40,000. The povidone iodine contains 10% available iodine, slowly released when applied to skin. This preparation is employed topically as a surgical scrub and non irritating antiseptic solution; its effectiveness is directly attributed to the presence and release of iodine from the complex. Commercial product: Betadine solution.

=== Transdermal patch ===
Transdermal patches can be a very precise time released method of delivering a drug. Cutting a patch in half might affect the dose delivered. The release of the active component from a transdermal delivery system (patch) may be controlled by diffusion through the adhesive which covers the whole patch, by diffusion through a membrane which may only have adhesive on the patch rim or drug release may be controlled by release from a polymer matrix. Cutting a patch might cause rapid dehydration of the base of the medicine and affect the rate of diffusion.

=== Vapor ===
Some medications are applied as an ointment or gel, and reach the mucous membrane via vaporization. Examples are nasal topical decongestants and smelling salt.

== Topical Drug Classification System ==
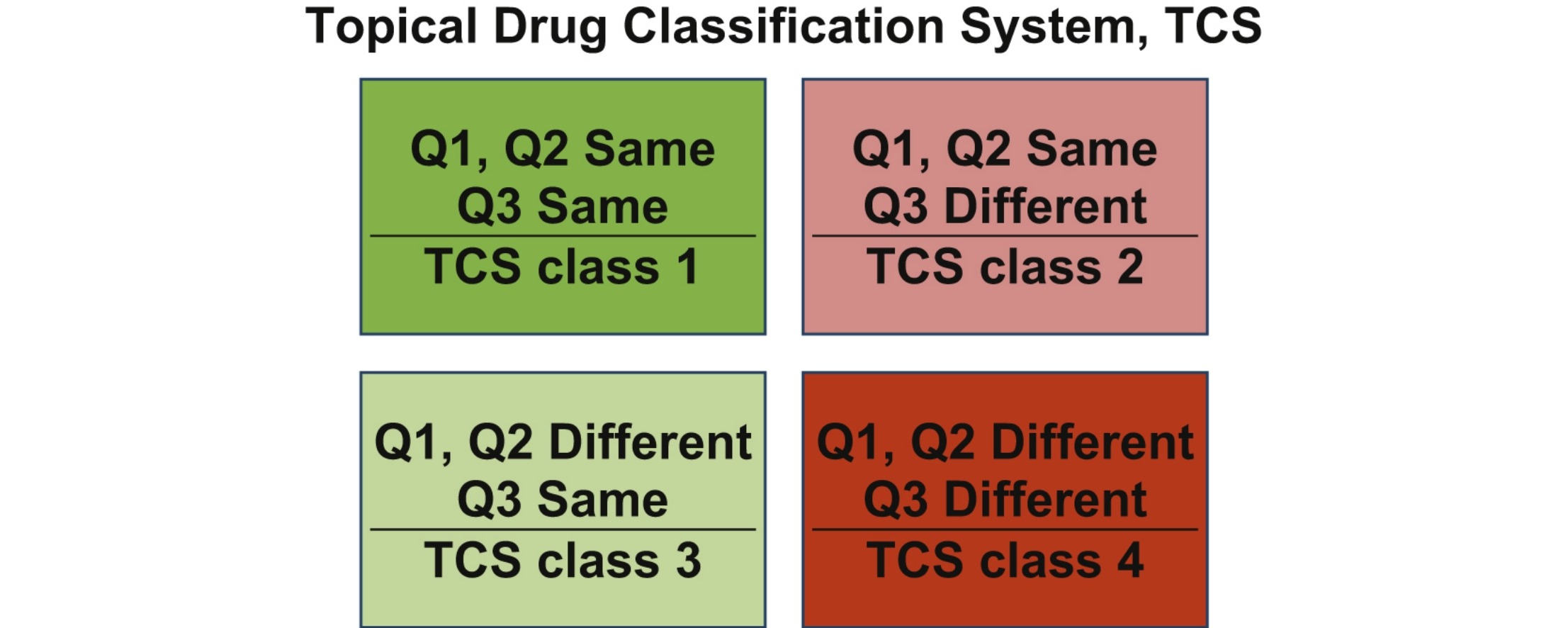
Graphical abstract of Topical Drug Classification System

A topical drug classification system is designed from the Biopharmaceutics Classification System for oral immediate release solid drug products.

=== Advantages ===
In the early 1970s, the Alza Corporation, through their founder Alejandro Zaffaroni, filed the first US patents describing transdermal delivery systems for scopolamine, nitroglycerin and nicotine. People found that applying medicines on the body surfaces is beneficial in many aspects. Skin medicines can give faster onset and local effect on our body as the surface cream can bypass first pass metabolism such as hepatic and intestinal metabolism. Apart from the absorption, dermal drugs effectively prevent oral delivery limitations such as nausea and vomiting and poor appliances due to unpalatable tastes of the drugs . Topical application is an easy way for patients to tackle skin infections in a painless and non-invasive way. From a patient perspective, applying drugs on skin also provides stable dosage in blood so as to give the optimal bioavailability and therapeutic effects. In case of overdose or unwanted side effects, patients can take off or wash out the medicines quickly to eliminate toxicity by simply removing the patch to stop the delivery of drugs.

=== Disadvantages ===
The site of putting the patches for topical drugs may get irritated and have rashes and feel itchy. Hence, some topical drugs including nicotine patches for smoking cessation are advised to change places for each application to avoid continuous irritation of the skin. Also, since the drug needs to penetrate the skin, some drugs may not be able to pass through the skin. Some drugs are then "wasted" and the bioavailability of the drug will decrease.

$$J=-D{dc \over dx}$$

where

- J is the diffusion flux
- D is the diffusion coefficient
- dc/dx is the concentration gradient

For D is described by the Stokes–Einstein equation. The equation is:

$$D=\frac{RT}{6\pi\eta rN_A}$$

where

- R is the gas constant
- T is the temperature
- η is the viscosity
- r is the radius of the solute.
- $N_A$ is the Avogadro constant

Assuming concentration gradient is constant for all newly applied topical drugs and the temperature is constant (normal body temperature: 37 °C), the viscosity and radius of the drug determine the flux of diffusion. The higher the viscosity or the larger the radius of the drug is, the lower the diffusion flux of the drug is.

== Developments ==
There are many factors for drug developers to consider in developing new topical formulations.

The first one is the effect of the drug vehicle. The medium to carry the topical drugs can affect the penetration of the drug active ingredient and efficacy. For example, this carrier can have a cooling, drying, emollient or protective action to suit the required conditions of the application site such as applying gel or lotion for hairy areas. Meanwhile, scientists need to match the type of preparation with the type of lesions. For example, they need to avoid oily ointments for acute weepy dermatitis. Chemists also need to consider the irritation or any sensitization potential to ensure that the topical application can be stable during storage and transport to maintain its efficacy. Another potential material is nanofiber-based dispersion to improve the adhesion of active ingredients on the skin.

In order to enhance drug penetration into the skin, scientists have several ways to achieve their purposes by using chemical, biochemical, physical, and super saturation enhancement. Advanced Emulgel technology is a breakthrough in painkilling topical drugs. It helps the gel to enter deeply down the skin layer to strengthen the delivery of diclofenac to the point of pain so as to achieve better therapeutic effects by modifying the above properties.

== See also ==
- Finger tip unit
- Liniment
- Topical anesthetic
- Topical antibiotic
- Topical corticosteroids
- Unguent
- Whitfield's ointment
