= Evaporation suppressing monolayers =

Evaporation suppressing monolayers are materials that when applied to the air/water interface, will spread (or self-assemble) and form a thin film across the surface of the water. The purpose of these materials is to reduce evaporative water loss from dams and reservoirs.

Self assembly of monolayer on water.

== Mechanism ==
The specific mechanism that underlies monolayer evaporation resistance has been attributed to the physical barrier formed by the presence of these materials on the surface of the water (see figure). The extent to which a material can resist the evaporation of water is best treated on a case-by-case basis, however, a number of empirically derived formulas have been reported. Before the advent of surface spectroscopic techniques such as Brewster Angle Microscopy (BAM) and Glancing Incidence X-Ray reflectometry (GIXD), it was thought that the intermolecular spacing between monolayer molecules was the largest determinant factor governing evaporation suppression. When the surface density of the monolayer was sufficiently small, water molecules were presumed to pass through the space between molecules. Scattering and imaging results, however, revealed that the intermolecular distance between monolayer molecules was essentially constant, and that evaporation was more likely at domain boundaries. The factors governing the efficacy of an evaporation suppressing monolayer are the ability to remain tightly packed despite changes in surface pressure, the ability to adhere to the surface of water, and to neighbouring molecules.

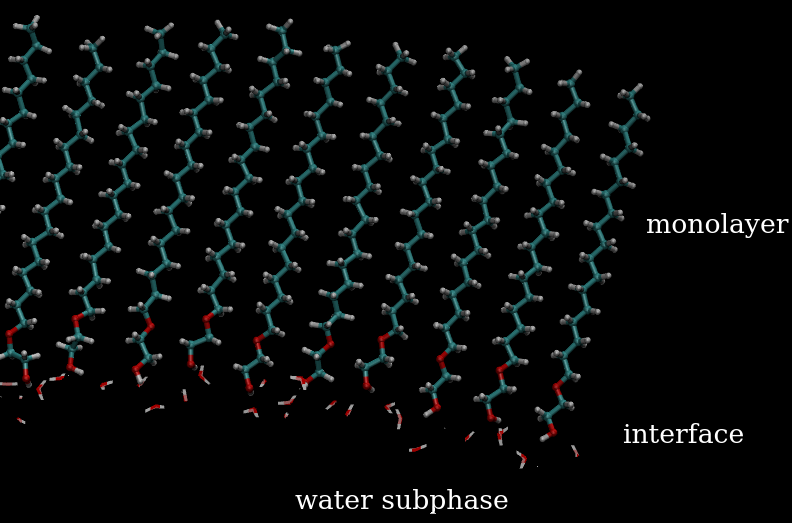
Cross section of simulation cell containing monolayer of ethylene glycol mono octadecyl ether (C18E1) on water. Blue represents carbon atoms, red is oxygen and white is hydrogen.

== History ==
Irving Langmuir accurately described the geometric structure of a monolayer film on water in 1917, work for which he would be later awarded the Nobel prize in chemistry. The evaporation suppressing properties of these materials were first reported by Rideal in the 1920s In the 1940s Langmuir and Schaefer quantified the evaporation resistance and its dependence on temperature. This work was extended by Archer and La Mer in the following decade, who observed a dependence on surface pressure, chain length, monolayer phase, subphase composition and surface temperature. Large scale field trials were being conducted at this time in Australia by Mansfield He reported that the results seen in the laboratory setting could not be replicated in real world conditions, with dust and wind being cited as adversely affecting evaporation suppressing performance.

In later decades, research efforts focussed on multicomponent monolayer materials such as hexadecanol + octadecanol, altering the number of carbons in the aliphatic chain, and later on, the addition of polymerised surfactants to increase monolayer stability.

Better monolayer materials are required as are better methods of monolayer distribution methods, although no resolution of these difficulties presently exists.

Despite research in this area for most of the 20th century, no durable, effective and inexpensive product has come to market. Recently, advances in experimental and modelling techniques have increased the understanding of these materials.

== Recent Developments ==
During a prolonged drought in Australia at the start of this century, scientists there from a number of research institutions, including Pr. David Solomon, inventor of the polymer banknote, set about developing a product that is efficacious, resistant to the deleterious effects of wind, and affordable. In addition to small and large scale field trials, new techniques were utilised including a novel evaporation tank with a controlled climate system to mimic the effects of wind and waves, and computational modelling was for the first time employed to relate dynamic and geometric properties at the atomistic level, with evaporation suppressing performance at the macroscopic level. The use of ethylene glycol monooctadecyl ether was found to substantially decrease evaporation resistance in the presence of wind, and the addition of a water-soluble polymer further enhanced its effectiveness.

== Commercial Products ==
WaterGuard manufactured by Aquatain advertises a polymer based material that reduces water evaporation. Other products include Solarpill and Water$aver. The efficacy of these products has not been shown.

== See also ==
- Self-assembled monolayer
- Monolayers
