= Eye liner =

Cosmetic applied around the eyes

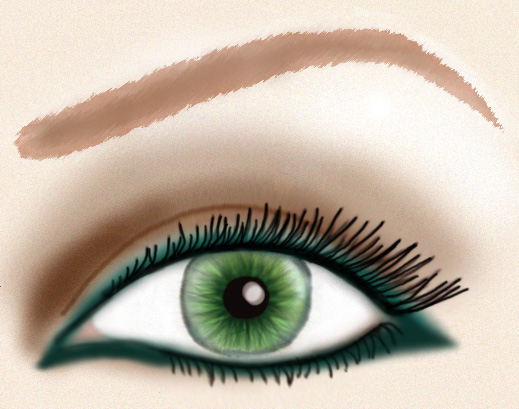
Dark teal eyeliner along the rim of the eye

Eye liner or eyeliner is a cosmetic used to define the eyes. It is applied around the contours of the eye(s). It is often used to create various aesthetic effects.

== History ==
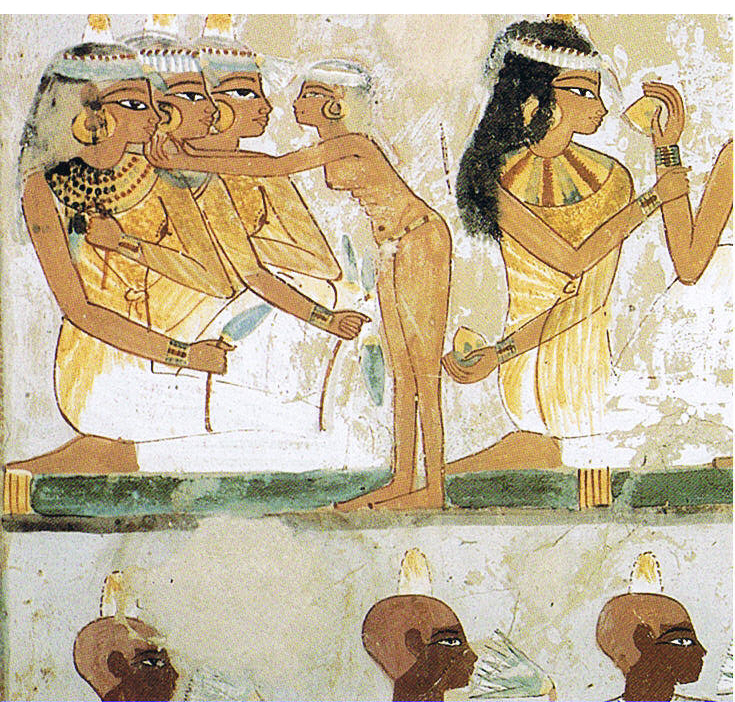
Ancient Egyptian women and men wearing msdmt (mesdemet, kohl) eye liner, from the tomb of Nakht in Thebes (15th century BC).

Eye liner was first used in ancient Egypt and Mesopotamia as a dark black line around the eyes. As early as 10,000 BC, Egyptians and Mesopotamians wore eyeliner not only for aesthetics but to protect the skin from the desert sun. Research has also speculated that eyeliner was worn to protect the wearer from the evil eye. The characteristic of having heavily lined eyes has been frequently depicted in ancient Egyptian art. They produced eyeliner with a variety of materials, including copper ore and antimony. Ancient Egyptian kohl contained galena, which was imported from nearby regions in the Land of Punt, Coptos and Western Asia.

In the 1960s, liquid eyeliner was used to create thick black and white lines around the eyes in the make-up fashion associated with designers like Mary Quant. The 1960s and 1970s also saw new fashion trends which made use of eyeliner, eyeshadow and mascara in new ways. As goth and punk fashion developed, they employed eyeliner for a dark and dramatic effect.

== Modern usage ==
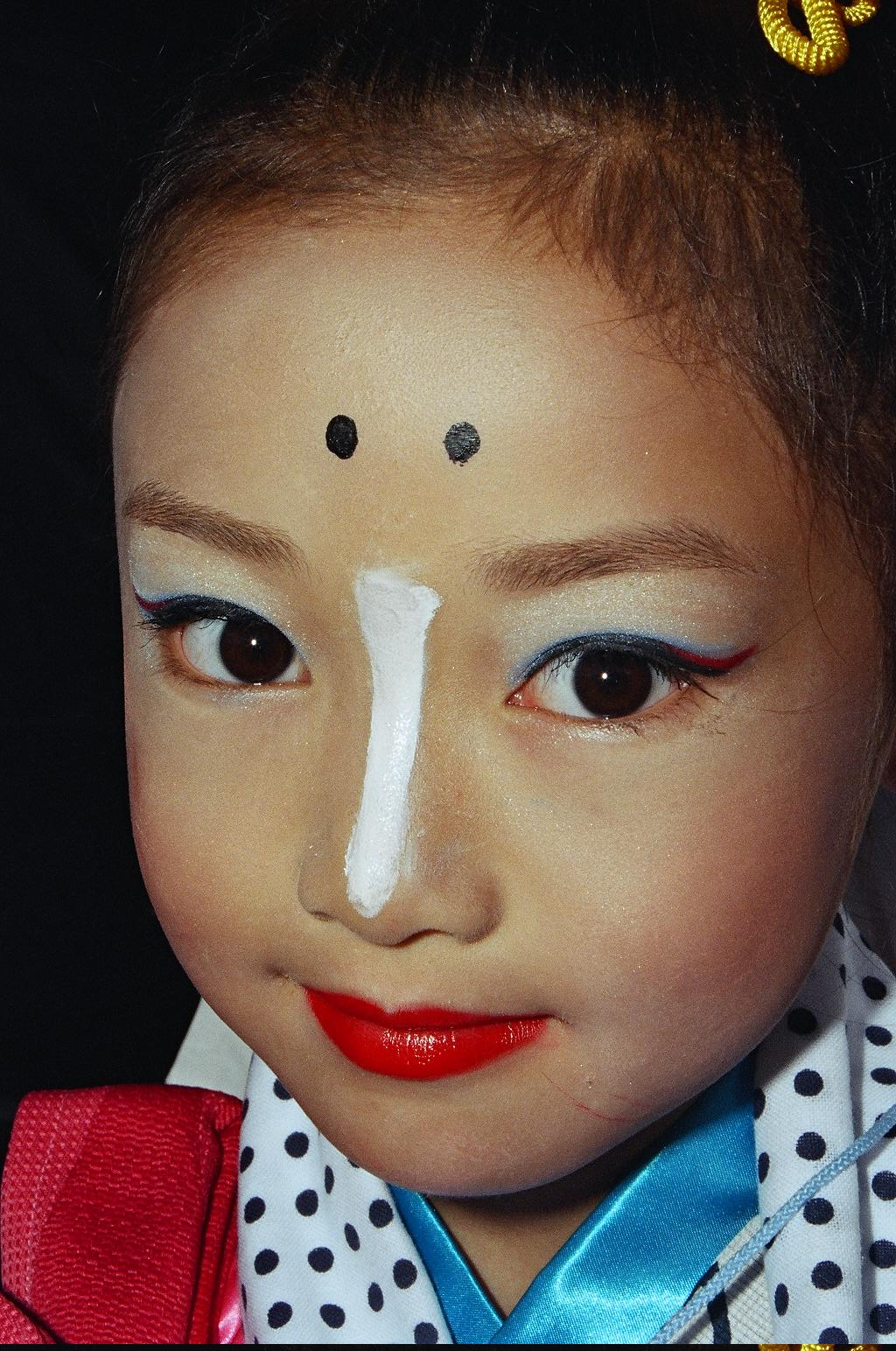
A girl wearing eye liner.

In the late twentieth and early twenty-first century, heavy eyeliner use has been associated with Goth fashion and Punk fashion. Eye liner of varying degrees of thickness has also become associated with the emo subculture and various alternative lifestyles. The term 'guyliner' has alternatively been used to describe men wearing eyeliner and was popularized during the emo subculture of the early 2000s thanks to members of bands like Fall Out Boy and Panic! at the Disco.

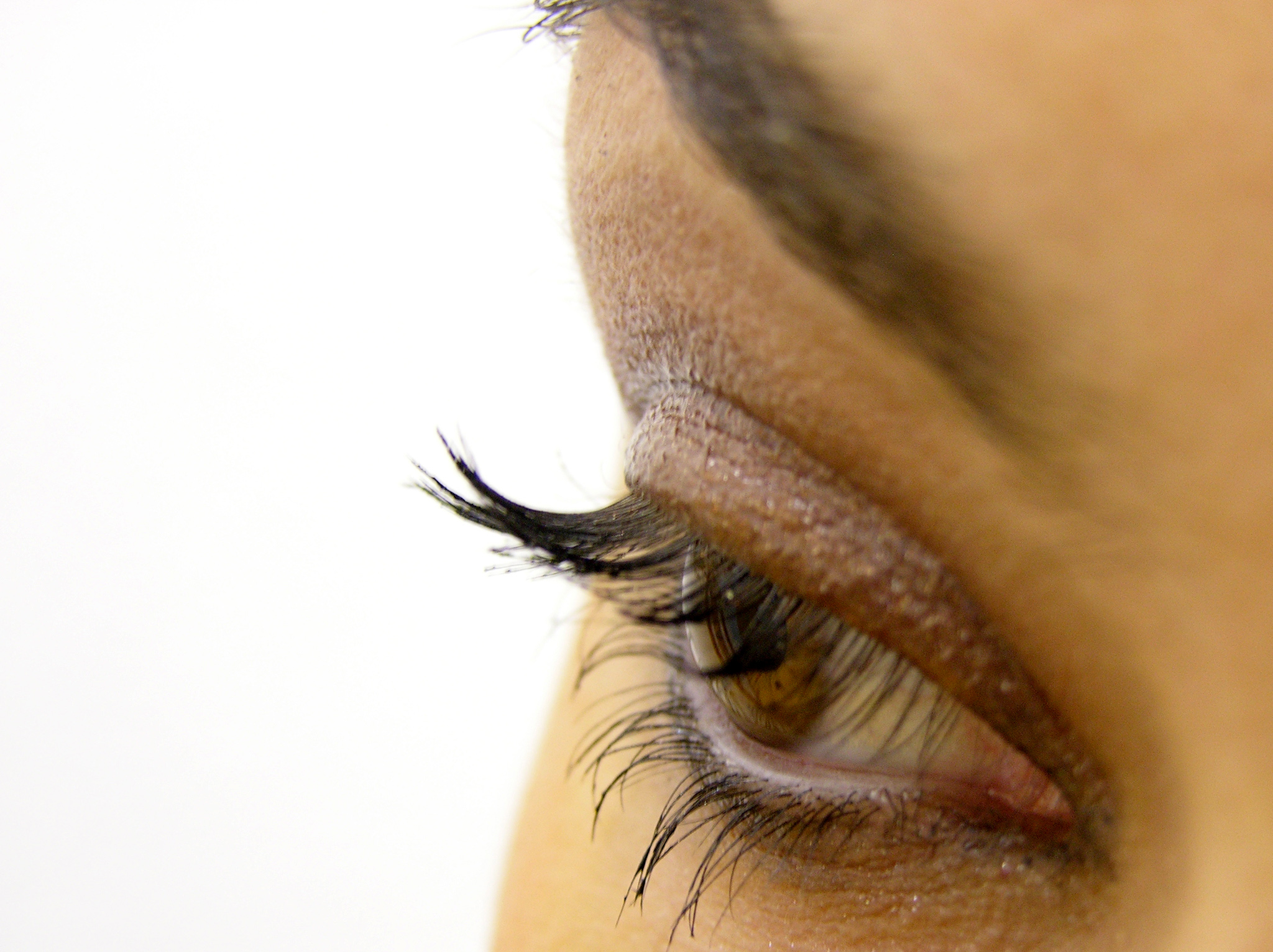
An eye with brown eye liner under the bottom lashes.

Eye liner is commonly used in a daily make-up routine to define the eye or create the look of a wider or smaller eye. It can be used as a tool to create various looks or to highlight different features of the eyes. Eye liner can be drawn above upper lashes or below lower lashes or both, even on the water lines of the eyes. Eye liner is available in a wide range of hues, from the common black, brown and grey to more adventurous shades such as bright primary colors, pastels, frosty silvers and golds, white, and even glitter-flecked colors.

=== Winged eye liner ===
Winged eyeliner defines the shape of the top eyelid and extends to a point or ‘wing’ about halfway toward the end of the eyebrow.

=== Cat eye ===
A cat eye looks similar to a winged liner. It has a thicker wing than a winged liner that involves the bottom and the top lash line.

=== Tight lining ===
Tight lining is the use of eyeliner tight against the waterline under the lashes of the upper lid and above the lashes of the lower lid. Due to the proximity to the membranes and the surface of the eye itself, waterproof eyeliner is preferred. Tight lining is a technique which makes the eyelashes appear to start farther back on the eyelid, thus making them look longer. Gel eyeliner and a small, angled brush may be used to create this look. Waterproof eyeliner pencils may also be used to create this look.

=== Permanent Eyeliner ===
Permanent eyeliner is a permanent makeup technique that uses tattooing to apply ink pigment along the eyelids, creating the appearance of eyeliner.

=== Application ===
Advice on application varies. Harper's Bazaar recommends applying the line in short strokes.

== Types ==
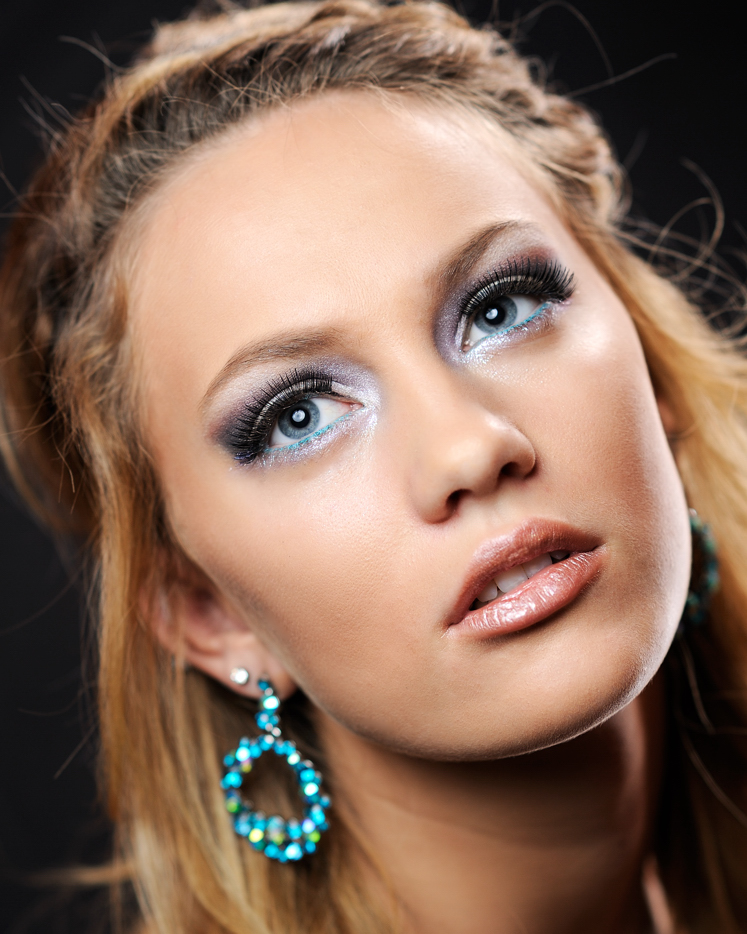
Woman with turquoise eye liner

Depending on its texture, eyeliner can be softly smudged or clearly defined. There are six main types of eyeliner available on the market: each produces a different effect.

- Liquid eyeliner is an opaque liquid that usually comes in a small bottle and is typically applied with a small sharp-tipped brush. It creates a clean, precise line. This type of eye liner is best used to create sharp, winged eyeliner. Because liquid eyeliner gives a much heavier appearance, it is often only applied to the upper lash line.
- Powder-based eye pencil is eyeliner in a wood pencil. It is generally available in dark, matted shades.
- Wax-based eye pencils are softer pencils and contain waxes that ease application. They come in a wide variety of intense colours as well as paler shades such as white or beige. Wax-based eyeliners can also come in a cone or a compact with a brush applicator. These are the cheapest and most ubiquitous eyeliner form
- Kohl eyeliner is a soft powder available in dark matte shades. It is most often used in black to outline the eyes. It comes in pencil, pressed powder, or loose powder form. This type of eyeliner is easy to smudge.
- Gel eyeliner, which is a softer gel liner that can be easily applied with an eyeliner brush. It can be precisely applied and is much softer than Kohl.
- Cake eyeliner, an eyeliner formula that is dry until wetted with water or setting spray, that is used with a brush. Cake eyeliners are offered in many colours and finishes and are often used for graphic eyeliner looks.
- Shimmer eyeliner, which is available in different bright colors applied on the upper as well as lower eyelid. It is offered with both shimmer finishes and glitter finishes.
- Felt tip eyeliner is a type of liquid eyeliner offered in a marker pen. It is usually a brush tip, and the size of the brush tip may vary depending on the manufacturer of the eyeliner, the trends in a certain market, and other factors. It is very precise as there is no need to sharpen, and the brush tip can get close to eyelashes, ensuring no gap. Some felt-tip eyeliners also have adhesive inside the ink, used for gluing on false eyelashes.

== Chemical composition ==
Traditional wax-based eyeliners are made from about 20 components. About 50% by weight are waxes (e.g., Japan wax, fats, or related soft materials that easily glide onto the skin. Stearyl heptanoate is found in most cosmetic eyeliner. Typical pigments include black iron oxides, as well as smaller amounts of titanium dioxide and Prussian blue.

For some traditional eye liners, to this date, lead oxide is still used as an ingredient, and this can expose the user, including children, to toxic lead

== See also ==
- Eye shadow
