= Skin secretions =

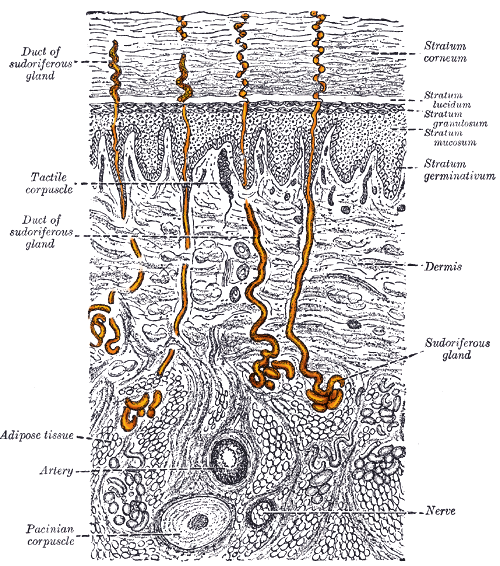
sweat gland

Skin secretions are those substances and materials that are secreted by the skin and the external mucous membranes. Some skin secretions are associated with body hair.

Skin secretions originate from glands that in dermal layer of the epidermis. Sweat, a physiological aid to body temperature regulation, is secreted by eccrine glands. Sebaceous glands secrete the skin lubricant sebum. Sebum is secreted onto the hair shaft and it prevents the hair from splitting. It consists mostly of lipids. After the sebum spreads along and up the hair shaft, it is distributed over the skin surface where it lubricates and waterproofs the outer layer of the skin, the stratum corneum.

Defensins are substances that are secreted onto the skin surface that are anti-microbial.
