= Emulsifying wax =

Cosmetics ingredient

Emulsifying wax is a cosmetic emulsifying ingredient. The ingredient name is often followed by the initials NF, indicating that it conforms to the specifications of the National Formulary.

Emulsifying wax is created when a wax material (either a vegetable wax of some kind or a petroleum-based wax) is treated with a detergent (typically sodium dodecyl sulfate or polysorbates) to cause it to make oil and water bind together into a smooth emulsion. It is a white waxy solid with a low fatty alcohol odor.

According to the United States Pharmacopoeia - National Formulary (USP-NF), the ingredients for emulsifying wax NF are cetearyl alcohol and a polyoxyethylene derivative of a fatty acid ester of sorbitan (a polysorbate).

In a cosmetic product, if the emulsifying wax used meets the standards for the National Formulary, it may be listed in the ingredient declaration by the term "emulsifying wax NF". Otherwise, the emulsifier is considered a blended ingredient and the individual components must be listed individually in the ingredient declaration, placed appropriately in descending order of predominance in the whole.

== Safety ==
The Cosmetic Ingredient Review Expert Panel reviewed the safety and use of Emulsifying Wax NF in 1984. Their review of usage reported during the previous years found only 12 products using emulsifying wax; those all had usage rates under 10%. Over 35 animal and human studies were cited in the review; none showed more than minor irritation or reaction. The safety assessment found that Emulsifying Wax NF was safe to use as a cosmetic ingredient at the then-present practices and concentrations of use.

The Cosmetic Ingredient Review Expert Panel revisited Emulsifying Wax NF in 2003. They found that it was used in 102 cosmetic products in 2002 at a maximum use concentration of 21% (in hair straighteners). Based on the data available in 2003, the CIR determined not to open a new safety assessment.
