= Ear eczema =

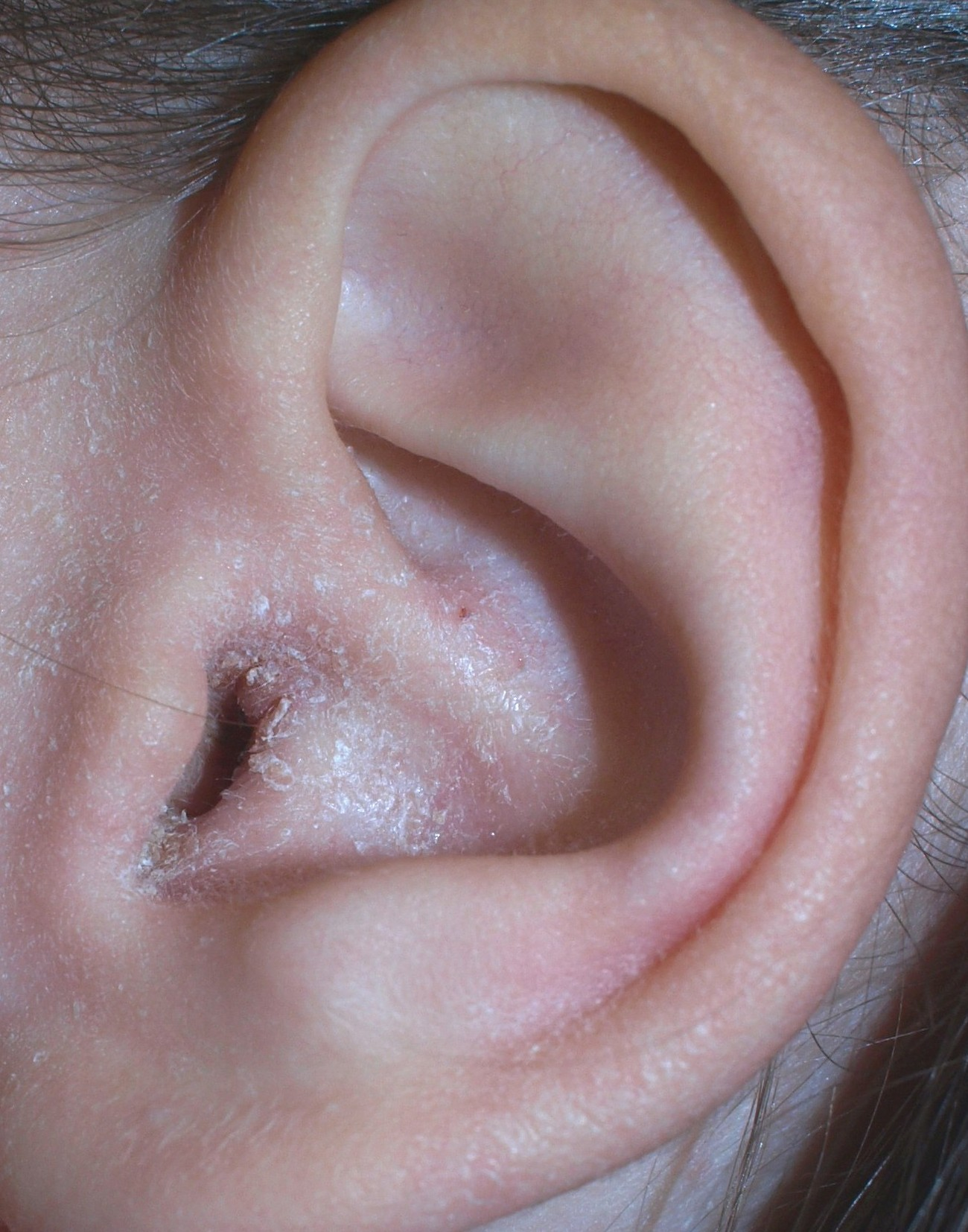
- Specialty: Dermatology

Auricular eczema is an eczema of the ear that may involve the helix, postauricular fold, and external auditory canal, with the most frequently affected site being the external canal, where it is often a manifestation of seborrheic dermatitis or allergic contact dermatitis. This is an neuro-allergic inflammation of skin with evident itch.

== Signs and symptoms ==
Small blisters appear on the skin of the external auditory canal and auricle. Then they burst and at the site multiple small erosions with abundant oozing lesions appear. Dry cracking skin on the outer ear may also appear causing itchiness. There is no known cause for ear eczema.

== Management ==
The management of ear eczema will depend on the type of eczema diagnosed upon presentation.

Generally, ear toileting and care are advised to help relieve symptoms. Washing the ears with an emollient and drying them is one way to achieve this. Patients are advised against putting anything in the ears or scratching them. Ear candles are not recommended as there is no research proof to support their efficacy.

Medical management will include topical steroids, antifungals, antibiotics, and calcineurin inhibitors such as cyclosporine and tacrolimus. Tacrolimus has been shown to be an effective and well-tolerated option in treating chronic dermatitis of the ear.

Other management strategies include limiting water exposure and using earplugs while swimming. Using objects such as matchsticks to scratch the outer ear canal should also be avoided.

== See also ==
- Skin lesion
- Eczema
- Ear infection
