= Carsten Flohr =

British-German Dermatology Consultant and Professor of Dermatology

Carsten Flohr (Dermatologist)
- Citizenship: United Kingdom & Germany
- Education: Göttingen University University of Cambridge University of Oxford London School of Hygiene and Tropical Medicine Nottingham University
- Occupations: Dermatology Consultant and Professor of Dermatology
- Employer: King's College London
- Known for: Paediatric dermatology
- Awards: Canadian Institute of Health Research Inclusive Research Excellence Prizes Team Science and Open Science; Honorary Member of the Société Française de Dermatologie; National Clinical Excellence Award; National Institute of Health Research Career Development Fellow

Carsten Flohr was born in Hannover, Germany. He attended the Matthias-Claudius Gymnasium Gehrden, where he won the prestigious Studienstiftung des deutschen Volkes prize, awarded to the top 1% of German secondary school graduates. Following a gap year in Taipei and Shanghai, Carsten Flohr co-enrolled in Medicine and Chinese Studies at Göttingen University, Germany, where he completed his pre-clinical studies with a distinction in 1993 and also later graduated with an MA in Chinese Studies (2000). Carsten Flohr then moved to Trinity College at Cambridge University to undertake a Master of Philosophy in the History of Medicine (1995), before moving to Balliol College at Oxford University to complete his clinical medical studies (1995–1998). He then trained in general medicine, paediatrics and dermatology in Oxford, Newcastle and Nottingham between 1998 and 2003, before being awarded the John Radcliffe Senior Research Fellowship from University College Oxford. This took him to study the links between helminth parasites and allergic disease at the Oxford University Clinical Research Unit in Vietnam (2004–2007), showing that gut parasites protect against allergic disease, one important reason why allergies are now so common in affluent country settings. While in Vietnam, Flohr also undertook a Masters of Science in Epidemiology at the London School of Hygiene & Tropical Medicine.

Flohr was the first dermatologist to become a UK National Institute for Health Research (NIHR) Clinician Scientist (2009–2014) and Career Development Fellow (2014–2020).

He is a Fellow of both the UK Royal College of Physicians and the Royal College of Paediatrics & Child Health and now works as an academic dermatologist in London, UK.

Flohr is Professor of Dermatology and Consultant Dermatologist at St John's Institute of Dermatology, Guy's & St Thomas' NHS Foundation Trust, where he is also Lead for Research and Development. Flohr also holds the Chair in Dermatology and Population Health Science at King's College London and is the Dermatology Specialty Lead for the South London National Institute for Health and Care Research (NIHR) Research Delivery Network.

He is a founding director of the International Eczema Council, director of the Global Atopic Dermatitis Atlas and Past President of the British Society of Paediatric and Adolescent Dermatology (BSPAD), as well as an honorary member of the Société Française de Dermatologie for his contribution to cutaneous medicine research [7]. He leads the European management guidelines for atopic eczema and is founding editor of the Evidence-based Dermatology Section of the British Journal of Dermatology.

== Awards ==
- Joint winner Canadian Institute of Health Research Inclusive Research Excellence Prizes Team Science and Open Science for "Living systematic review and network meta-analysis of systemic immunomodulatory treatments for atopic dermatitis" 2023
- Honorary Member of the Société Française de Dermatologie 2020
- National Clinical Excellence Award 2021
- National Institute of Health Research Career Development Fellow, 2014-2020
- National Institute of Health Research Clinical Scientist, 2009-2014
- President's Prize, Royal Society of Medicine Immunology Section, 2008
- Barry Kay Award for best clinical scientific research, British Society for Allergy and Clinical Immunology, 2007
- Overseas Scholarship, German National Scholarship Foundation, 1995-1998
- The John Friend Prize in Medical History, Oxford University, 1996
- Trinity College Internal Scholarship, Cambridge University, 1994-1995
- British Academy Scholarship, Cambridge University, 1994-1995
- Scholar of the German National Scholarship Foundation (Studienstiftung des deutschen Volkes, awarded to top 1% of German of German university students 1991–1995)

== Current research ==
Carsten Flohr has a particular interest in childhood atopic eczema and its links with other allergic diseases, evidence-based dermatology, dermato-epidemiology, and clinical trials. He has widely published in these fields. He was Chief Investigator of the UK-Irish treatment of severe eczema in children trial (TREAT). He is also Chief Investigator of the UK-Irish Atopic Eczema Systemic Therapy Register (A-STAR), the European DREAM to TREAT AD study, the EU Horizon 2020 Joint Program Initiative-funded TRANS-FOODS and the Mind & Skin consortia. Carsten Flohr leads the International League of Dermatological Societies (ILDS) Global Atopic Dermatitis Atlas (GADA) project.
