= Moisturizer =

Type of cosmetic

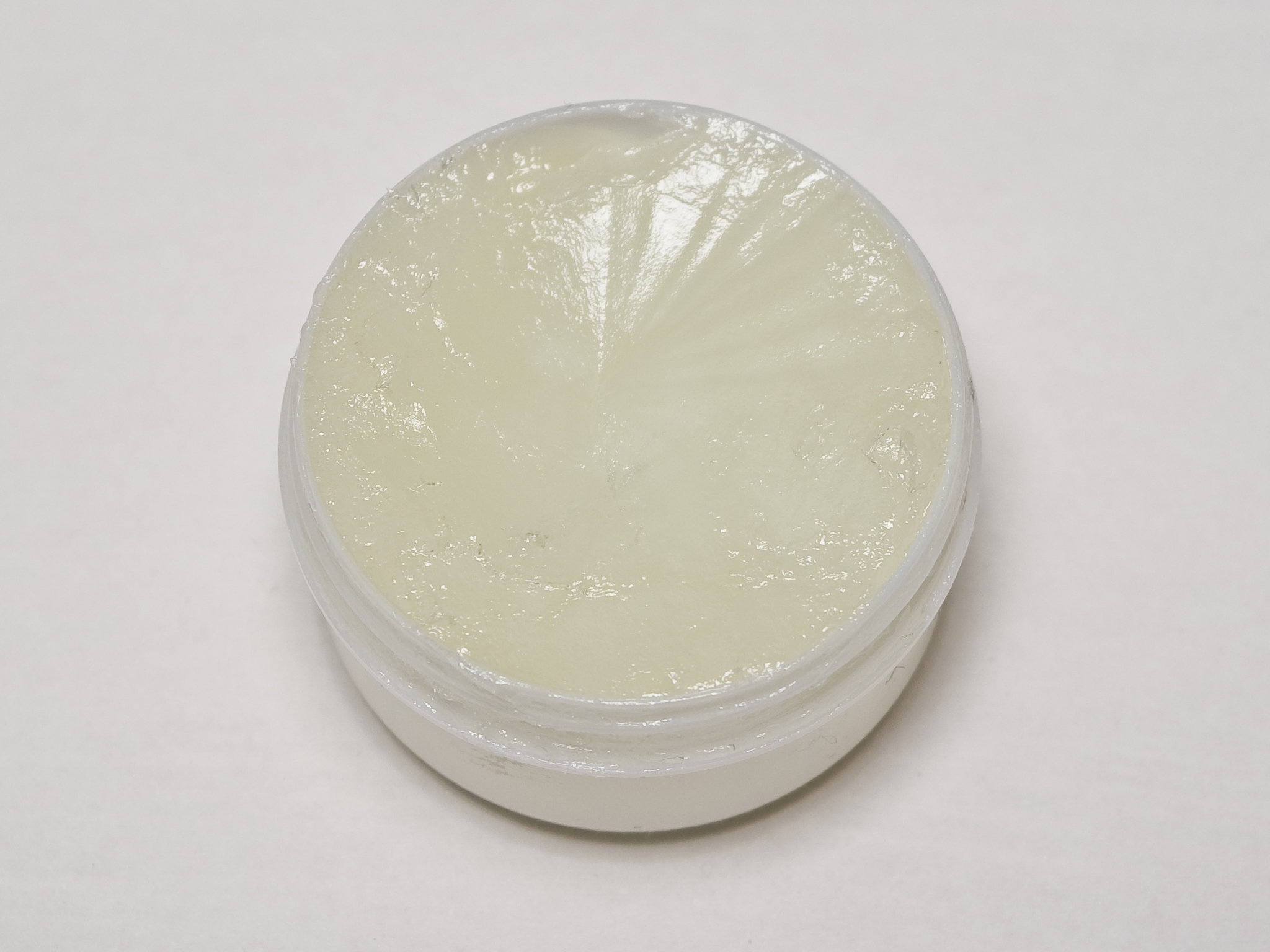
- White Petrolatum
- Type: Cosmetic skincare product

A moisturizer, or emollient, is a cosmetic preparation used for protecting, moisturizing, and lubricating the skin. These functions are normally performed by sebum produced by healthy skin. The word "emollient" is derived from the Latin verb mollire, to soften.

== Mechanism of action ==
In the human body, water constantly evaporates from the deeper layers of the skin through an effect known as transepidermal water loss. By regulating its water content, human skin naturally maintains a dry, easily shed surface as a barrier against pathogens, dirt, or damage, while protecting itself from drying out and becoming brittle and rigid. The ability to retain moisture depends on the lipid bilayer between the dead skin cells. Moisturizers modify the rate of water loss, with active ingredients of moisturizers falling into one of two categories: occlusives and humectants.

Occlusives form a hydrophobic coating on the surface of the skin, keeping moisture from escaping. The more occlusive the formulation, the greater the effect. Ointments are more occlusive than aqueous creams, which are more occlusive than lotion. Water loss through the skin is normally about 4–8 g/(m^{2}⋅h). A layer of petrolatum applied to normal skin can reduce that loss by 50–75% for several hours. Oils naturally produced by the human body moisturize through this same mechanism.

Humectants are hydrophilic and absorb water. They absorb water from humid air (when >70% humidity) to moisturize the skin. Humectants can also draw moisture from deeper layers of the skin to the surface, which may reduce hydration in the lower layers if not combined with occlusives. When used in practical applications, humectants are combined with occlusives. Moisturizers commonly contain water, which acts as a temporary hydration agent.

== Types ==
There are many different types of moisturizers. Petrolatum is one of the most effective moisturizers, although it can be unpopular due to its oily consistency. Other popular moisturizers are cetyl alcohol, cetearyl alcohol, cocoa butter, isopropyl myristate, isopropyl palmitate, lanolin, liquid paraffin, polyethylene glycols, shea butter, silicone oils, stearic acid, stearyl alcohol and castor oil, and other oils.

Moisturizers may also be available as lotions, creams, ointments, bath oils, or soap substitutes. Mineral oils and waxes are not prone to oxidation or rancidity. For this reason, they have essentially replaced vegetable oils in emollients and topical medication.

Moisturizer cosmetics may additionally contain antioxidants, ceramides, emulsifiers, fragrances, penetration enhancers, preservatives, and solvents. Some products are marketed as having anti-wrinkle and skin enhancement effects. Many plant products have been claimed to impart skin benefits. There is scientific evidence to support that some ingredients used in moisturizer products provide skin improvements, such as retinol, vitamin C, melatonin and protocatechuic acid.

In recent years, manufacturers have increasingly utilized plant-based emollients derived from renewable sources such as coconut oil, camellia seed oil, avocado oil, rapeseed oil, corn oil, soy oil, and castor oil.

Selection of these botanical emollients is particularly crucial for oily and acne-prone skin types, where maintaining a non-comedogenic profile is essential to prevent pore congestion while ensuring adequate barrier repair. Recent dermatological trends favor specific plant-derived formulations that balance essential fatty acids to provide hydration without exacerbating sebum production.

== Use ==
Moisturizers are used for the treatment of certain skin diseases, such as psoriasis, ichthyosis vulgaris, xerosis, and pruritus in atopic dermatitis. More often, they are bases or vehicles for topical medication, such as in Whitfield's ointment. They are often combined with humectants, such as salicylic acid and urea.

Moisturizers are also widely used in sunscreens, antiperspirants, skin cleansers, shaving creams, aftershaves, and hair tonics. Moisturizers are used in disposable diapers to prevent dry skin and diaper dermatitis.

Moisturizers show some beneficial effects in treating atopic dermatitis (eczema). Using moisturizers helps to improve skin comfort and may reduce disease flares. They can be used as leave-on treatments, bath additives, or soap substitutes. There are many different moisturizer products, but the majority of leave-on treatments (from least to most greasy) are one of the following: lotions, creams, gels, or ointments. As none of the different types of moisturizers are more effective than the others, people with atopic dermatitis need to choose one or more products according to their age, affected body site, climate/season, and personal preference. Daily moisturizer use in infants does not prevent eczema, and the regular use of moisturizers on healthy infants is not recommended.

== Potential health risks ==
=== Contact dermatitis ===
Persistent moisturization to the skin involving allergens or irritants can cause contact dermatitis. Changes in the skin's normal ecological environment–either atop or within the skin–can also allow for the overgrowth of pathogens, resulting in skin infections. In the case when a patient has dermatitis, moisturizing products should not be applied more than once a day for patients with dermatitis.

=== Allergens ===
Aromas or food additives in moisturizers may trigger an immune reaction, including development of an allergy. There is currently no regulation over use of the term "hypoallergenic". In fact, some pediatric skin products marketed as hypoallergenic contained allergens. Those with eczema are especially vulnerable to allergic reaction with lotions and creams, as their compromised skin barrier allows preservatives to bind with and activate immune cells. The American Academy of Allergy, Asthma, and Immunology released a warning in 2014 that natural lotion containing ingredients commonly found in food (such as oats, goats milk, cow's milk, coconut milk, or oil) may introduce new allergies, potentially causing an allergic reaction upon later consuming such foods. Frequent skin moisturization in early life might promote the development of food allergy, even when skin conditions such as eczema are taken into account.

=== Fire risk ===
Paraffin-based skincare products and contaminated clothing can pose a serious fire hazard. Between 2010 and 2018, paraffin was linked to 50 fire incidents (49 of which were fatal) in the U.K. A West Yorkshire Fire and Rescue Service study found that clothing contaminated with cream containing only 21% paraffin, when set alight, was fully engulfed in flame in 3 seconds. The Medicines and Healthcare products Regulatory Agency (MHRA) released a warning in 2008 about the flammability of paraffin-based products. MHRA recommends that regular paraffin users change their sheets regularly, and refrain from smoking or bringing open flames near paraffin-coated people or objects. MHRA also recommends that skin creams containing any paraffin have a flammability warning on the packaging.

== Brands of moisturizers ==
- Artistry
- Aveeno
- Bath & Body Works
- CeraVe
- Cetaphil
- Charlotte Tilbury
- Curél
- Dial
- Diprobase
- Eucerin
- Gold Bond
- Garnier
- Jergens
- Johnson & Johnson
- Lux
- Neutrogena
- Nivea
- Olay
- Sebamed
- Simple Skincare
- Suave
- Vaseline

== See also ==
- Barrier cream
- Skincare
- Cosmetics
- Vaseline
- Petroleum jelly
