= Cetostearyl alcohol =

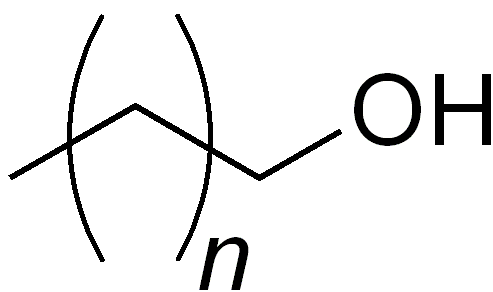
- n = ~14-16

Names
- Other names Cetearyl alcohol; Cetylstearyl alcohol; Cetyl/stearyl alcohol

Identifiers
CAS Number	67762-27-0
ChemSpider	none
ECHA InfoCard	100.060.898
EC Number	267-008-6
UNII	2DMT128M1S
CompTox Dashboard (EPA)	DTXSID0028323

Properties
Chemical formula	CH_{3}(CH_{2})_{n}CH_{2}OH; n=variable, typically 14-16
Melting point	48 to 56 °C (118 to 133 °F; 321 to 329 K)

Hazards
- GHS labelling
Pictograms	(GHS07: Exclamation mark)
Signal word	Warning
Hazard statements	H315, H319, H413
Precautionary statements	P281, P501
NFPA 704 (fire diamond)	1 1 0
Safety data sheet (SDS)	makingcosmetics.com
- Except where otherwise noted, data are given for materials in their standard state (at 25 °C [77 °F], 100 kPa). Infobox references

Cetostearyl alcohol, cetearyl alcohol or cetylstearyl alcohol is a mixture of fatty alcohols, consisting predominantly of cetyl (16 C) and stearyl alcohols (18 C) and is classified as a fatty alcohol. It is used as an emulsion stabilizer, opacifying agent, and foam boosting surfactant, as well as an aqueous and nonaqueous viscosity-increasing agent. It imparts an emollient feel to the skin and can be used in water-in-oil emulsions, oil-in-water emulsions, and anhydrous formulations. It is commonly used in hair conditioners and other hair products.

5% cetyl stearyl alcohol in petrolatum is cytotoxic per the MTT assay.
