= C4H10O =

The molecular formula C_{4}H_{10}O may refer to:

- Butanols
  - 1-Butanol (n-Butanol)
  - 2-Butanol (sec-Butanol)
  - Isobutanol (2-methylpropan-1-ol)
  - tert-Butyl alcohol (tert-Butanol, 2-methylpropanol)
- Ethers:
  - Diethyl ether (ethoxyethane)
  - Methoxypropane (methyl propyl ether or 1-methoxypropane)
  - Methyl isopropyl ether (isopropyl methyl ether or 2-methoxypropane)
