= 1-Butanol =

Chemical compound (C4H9OH)

Skeletal formula of n-butanol
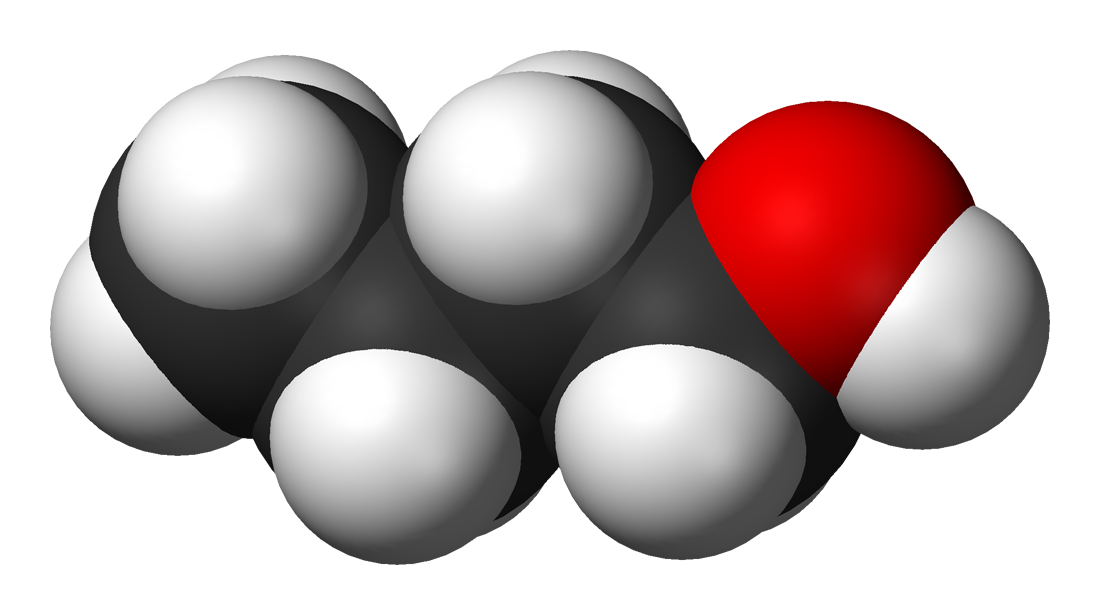
Spacefill model of n-butanol
- Skeletal formula of n-butanol with all explicit hydrogens added

Names
- Preferred IUPAC name Butan-1-ol
- Other names n-Butanol n-Butyl alcohol n-Butyl hydroxide n-Propylcarbinol n-Propylmethanol; 1-Hydroxybutane; Methylolpropane

Identifiers
CAS Number	71-36-3
3D model (JSmol)	Interactive image
Abbreviations	BuOH n-BuOH nBuOH^{n}BuOH
Beilstein Reference	969148
ChEBI	CHEBI:28885
ChEMBL	ChEMBL14245
ChemSpider	258
DrugBank	DB02145
ECHA InfoCard	100.000.683
EC Number	200-751-6
Gmelin Reference	25753
KEGG	D03200
MeSH	1-Butanol
PubChem CID	263
RTECS number	EO1400000
UNII	8PJ61P6TS3
UN number	1120
CompTox Dashboard (EPA)	DTXSID1021740
- InChI: InChI=1S/C4H10O/c1-2-3-4-5/h5H,2-4H2,1H3 Key: LRHPLDYGYMQRHN-UHFFFAOYSA-N; InChI=1/C4H10O/c1-2-3-4-5/h5H,2-4H2,1H3
- SMILES: OCCCC

Properties
Chemical formula	C_{4}H_{10}O
Molar mass	74.123 g·mol^{−1}
Appearance	Colourless, refractive liquid
Odor	banana-like, harsh, alcoholic and sweet
Density	0.81 g/cm^{3}
Melting point	−89.8 °C (−129.6 °F; 183.3 K)
Boiling point	117.7 °C (243.9 °F; 390.8 K)
Solubility in water	73 g/L at 25 °C
Solubility	very soluble in acetone miscible with ethanol, ethyl ether
log P	0.839
Vapor pressure	0.58 kPa (20 °C) ILO International Chemical Safety Cards (ICSC)
Acidity (pK_{a})	16.10
Magnetic susceptibility (χ)	−56.536·10^{−6} cm^{3}/mol
Refractive index (n_{D})	1.3993 (20 °C)
Viscosity	2.573 mPa·s (at 25 °C)
Dipole moment	1.66 D

Thermochemistry
Std molar entropy (S^{⦵}_{298})	225.7 J/(K·mol)
Std enthalpy of formation (Δ_{f}H^{⦵}_{298})	−328(4) kJ/mol
Std enthalpy of combustion (Δ_{c}H^{⦵}_{298})	−2670(20) kJ/mol

Hazards
- GHS labelling
Pictograms	(GHS02: Flammable) (GHS05: Corrosive) (GHS07: Exclamation mark)
Hazard statements	H226, H302, H315, H318, H335, H336
Precautionary statements	P210, P233, P240, P241, P242, P243, P261, P264, P264+P265, P270, P271, P280, P301+P317, P302+P352, P303+P361+P353, P304+P340, P305+P354+P338, P317, P319, P321, P330, P332+P317, P362+P364, P370+P378, P403+P233, P403+P235, P405, P501
NFPA 704 (fire diamond)	1 3 0
Flash point	35 °C (95 °F; 308 K)
Autoignition temperature	343 °C (649 °F; 616 K)
Explosive limits	1.45–11.25%
- Lethal dose or concentration (LD, LC)
LD_{50} (median dose)	790 mg/kg (rat, oral)
LD_{Lo} (lowest published)	3484 mg/kg (rabbit, oral); 790 mg/kg (rat, oral); 1700 mg/kg (dog, oral)
LC_{50} (median concentration)	9221 ppm (mammal); 8000 ppm (rat, 4 h)
- NIOSH (US health exposure limits)
PEL (Permissible)	TWA 100 ppm (300 mg/m^{3})
REL (Recommended)	C 50 ppm (150 mg/m^{3}) [skin]
IDLH (Immediate danger)	1400 ppm
Safety data sheet (SDS)	ICSC 0111

Related compounds
Related compounds	Butanethiol n-Butylamine; Diethyl ether Pentane
- Except where otherwise noted, data are given for materials in their standard state (at 25 °C [77 °F], 100 kPa). verify (what is ?) Infobox references

1-Butanol, also known as butan-1-ol or n-butanol, is a primary alcohol with the chemical formula C_{4}H_{10}O, C_{4}H_{9}OH or CH_{3}(CH_{2})_{3}OH and a linear structure. Isomers of 1-butanol are isobutanol, butan-2-ol and tert-butanol. The unmodified term butanol usually refers to the straight chain isomer.

1-Butanol occurs naturally as a minor product of the ethanol fermentation of sugars and other saccharides and is present in many foods and drinks. It is also a permitted artificial flavorant in the United States, used in butter, cream, fruit, rum, whiskey, ice cream and ices, candy, baked goods, and cordials. It is also used in a wide range of consumer products.

The largest use of 1-butanol is as an industrial intermediate, particularly for the manufacture of butyl acetate (itself an artificial flavorant and industrial solvent). It is a petrochemical derived from propylene. Estimated production figures for 1997 are: United States 784,000 tonnes; Western Europe 575,000 tonnes; Japan 225,000 tonnes.

== Production ==
Since the 1950s, most 1-butanol is produced by the hydroformylation of propene (oxo process) to preferentially form the butyraldehyde n-butanal. Typical catalysts are based on cobalt and rhodium. Butyraldehyde is then hydrogenated to produce butanol.

A second method for producing butanol involves the Reppe reaction of propylene with CO and water:

CH_{3}CH=CH_{2} + H_{2}O + 2 CO → CH_{3}CH_{2}CH_{2}CH_{2}OH + CO_{2}

In former times, butanol was prepared from crotonaldehyde, which can be obtained from acetaldehyde.

Butanol can also be produced by fermentation of biomass by bacteria. Prior to the 1950s, Clostridium acetobutylicum was used in industrial fermentation to produce butanol. Research in the past few decades showed results of other microorganisms that can produce butanol through fermentation.

Butanol can be produced via furan hydrogenation over Pd or Pt catalyst at high temperature and high pressure.

== Industrial use ==
Constituting 85% of its use, 1-butanol is mainly used in the production of varnishes. It is a popular solvent, e.g. for nitrocellulose. A variety of butanol derivatives are used as solvents, e.g. butoxyethanol or butyl acetate. Many plasticizers are based on butyl esters, e.g., dibutyl phthalate. The monomer butyl acrylate is used to produce polymers. It is the precursor to n-butylamines.

=== Biofuel ===
1-Butanol has been proposed as a substitute for diesel fuel and gasoline. It is produced in small quantities in nearly all fermentations (see fusel oil). Clostridium produces much higher yields of butanol. Research is underway to increase the biobutanol yield from biomass.

Butanol is considered as a potential biofuel (butanol fuel). Butanol at 85 percent strength can be used in cars designed for gasoline without any change to the engine (unlike 85% ethanol), and it provides more energy for a given volume than ethanol, almost as much as gasoline. Therefore, a vehicle using butanol would return fuel consumption more comparable to gasoline than ethanol. Butanol can also be added to diesel fuel to reduce soot emissions.

The production of, or in some cases, the use of, the following substances may result in exposure to 1-butanol: artificial leather, butyl esters, rubber cement, dyes, fruit essences, lacquers, motion picture, and photographic films, raincoats, perfumes, pyroxylin plastics, rayon, safety glass, shellac varnish, and waterproofed cloth.

== Occurrence in nature ==
Butan-1-ol occurs naturally as a result of carbohydrate fermentation in a number of alcoholic beverages, including beer, grape brandies, wine, and whisky. It has been detected in the volatiles of hops, jack fruit, heat-treated milks, musk melon, cheese, southern pea seed, and cooked rice. 1-Butanol is also formed during deep frying of corn oil, cottonseed oil, trilinolein, and triolein.

Butan-1-ol is one of the "fusel alcohols" (from the German for "bad liquor"), which include alcohols that have more than two carbon atoms and have significant solubility in water. It is a natural component of many alcoholic beverages, albeit in low and variable concentrations. It (along with similar fusel alcohols) is reputed to be responsible for severe hangovers, although experiments in animal models show no evidence for this.

1-Butanol is used as an ingredient in processed and artificial flavorings, and for the extraction of lipid-free protein from egg yolk, natural flavouring materials and vegetable oils, the manufacture of hop extract for beermaking, and as a solvent in removing pigments from moist curd leaf protein concentrate.

== Metabolism and toxicity ==
The acute toxicity of 1-butanol is relatively low, with oral LD_{50} values of 790–4,360 mg/kg (rat; comparable values for ethanol are 7,000–15,000 mg/kg). It is metabolized completely in vertebrates in a manner similar to ethanol: alcohol dehydrogenase converts 1-butanol to butyraldehyde; this is then converted to butyric acid by aldehyde dehydrogenase. Butyric acid can be fully metabolized to carbon dioxide and water by the β-oxidation pathway. In the rat, only 0.03% of an oral dose of 2,000 mg/kg was excreted in the urine. At sub-lethal doses, 1-butanol acts as a depressant of the central nervous system, similar to ethanol: one study in rats indicated that the intoxicating potency of 1-butanol is about 6 times higher than that of ethanol, possibly because of its slower transformation by alcohol dehydrogenase.

=== Other hazards ===
Liquid 1-butanol, as is common with most organic solvents, is extremely irritating to the eyes; repeated contact with the skin can also cause irritation. This is believed to be a generic effect of defatting. No skin sensitization has been observed. Irritation of the respiratory pathways occurs only at very high concentrations (>2,400 ppm).

With a flash point of 35 °C, 1-butanol presents a moderate fire hazard: it is slightly more flammable than kerosene or diesel fuel but less flammable than many other common organic solvents. The depressant effect on the central nervous system (similar to ethanol intoxication) is a potential hazard when working with 1-butanol in enclosed spaces, although the odour threshold (0.2–30 ppm) is far below the concentration which would have any neurological effect.

== See also ==
- Butanol fuel
