= Hydrocarbon plant =

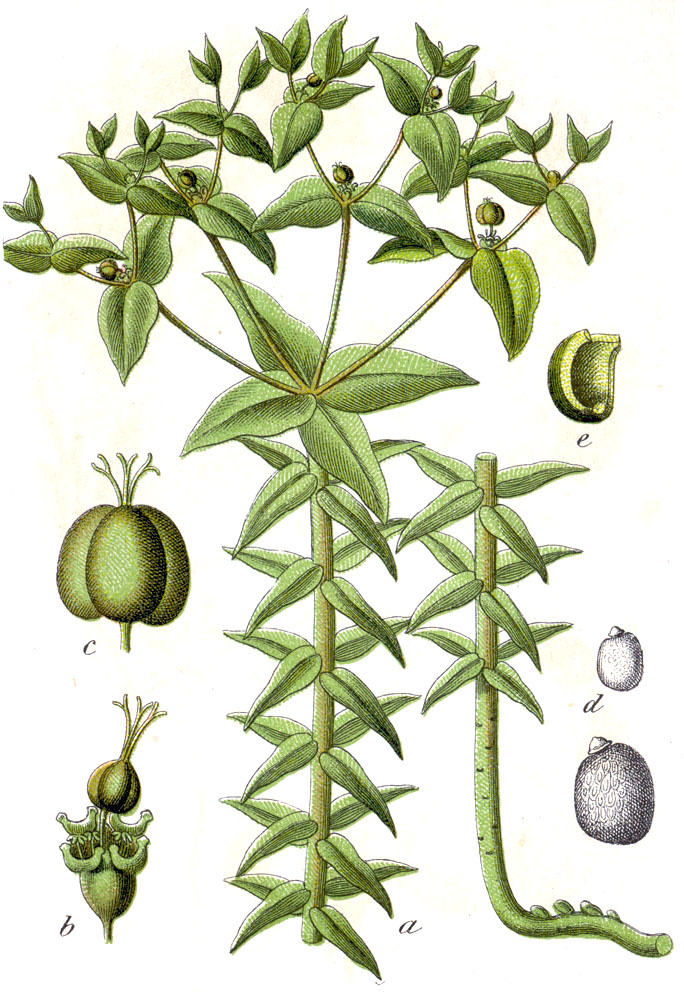
Euphorbia lathyris, which has been the subject of hydrocarbon plant research for many years

Hydrocarbon plants are plants that follow certain metabolic pathways that produce hydrocarbon products similar to petroleum. These hydrocarbon products are called terpenoids. The plants that produce terpenoids in large enough quantities to be harvested can be as big as trees or as small as single-cell algae. The family Euphorbiaceae has been studied in detail by Dr. Melvin Calvin, Nobel Laureate, and discoverer of the Calvin Cycle. One particular tree of the genus Hevea, more commonly known as the rubber tree, is probably the most famous hydrocarbon plant, supplying an estimated one third of the world’s rubber demand. It is still not as quick and cheap to make as petroleum-based rubber, which is why it does not occupy a larger portion of the market. Hevea naturally produces a latex substance which can tapped by cutting into the tree, and the latex can then be processed into rubber.

Most hydrocarbon plants are not trees, so this technique of tapping the tree is no longer feasible. Instead of tapping the tree, the hydrocarbons are extracted using various organic solvents. This process is especially useful with single-cell algae, such as Botryococcus braunii. This algae has two forms, both of which live in brackish water. The first form is a red algae that produces odd-numbered carbon chains roughly 25-31 atoms in length. These carbon chains usually do not possess a large number of double bonds. The second type of B. braunii is green and produces even-numbered carbon chains that are between 34 and 38 carbons long, with many double bonds present. While the cause of this difference is not well-studied, the two different algae can be used for discrete purposes.

Dr. Calvin began his studies of hydrocarbon plants in 1977 by looking at yields of Euphorbia lathyris over two years. While his results were limited, due to growing season complications, he did find a substantial amount of hydrocarbon products. Once the plant samples were separated using adsorption chromatography and column chromatography, they were analyzed via mass spectrometry, IR spectroscopy, UV spectroscopy, and gas chromatography, 31-and-34-carbon-long alkane chains were found to be present in the hexane layer of the adsorption chromatography

== The PETRO project ==
The PETRO project is a program started in 2011 in an attempt to create petroleum products using plants. The program is composed of ten projects that intend to extract petroleum directly from plants without affecting the U.S. food supply. The goal of the program is to make more oil per acre than what we have now, and with less processing before it gets to the pump. This results in a process that is cleaner, uses less energy, and is more sustainable than the system we have in place presently.

The ten PETRO projects include:

1. Harvesting the sugar from sorghum and processing it into farnesene, which is an additive in diesel fuels.
2. Designing carbon fixation pathways to produce pyruvic acid.
3. Manipulating the oil producing plant Camelina so that it is drought and cold resistant, making it possible to grow in harsh environments.
4. Making photosynthesis more effective by changing chemical pathways.
5. Turning sugarcane and sorghum into oil-producing crops.
6. Engineering Camelina so that the topmost leaves reflect light onto the lower part of the plant, thereby increasing the overall efficiency of the plant.
7. Modifying Camelina so that it produces copious terpenes and modified oils.
8. Engineering tobacco so that it produces fuel molecules in its leaves.
9. Increasing the turpentine harvest in pine trees.
10. Developing plants that produce vegetable oil in their leaves and stems as opposed to their seeds.

All of these efforts are funded through the ARPA-E program available through the U.S. Department of Energy. The program, headed by Jonathan Burbaum, has received over $37,000,000 of funding since its initial acceptance into the ARPA-E program.

== See also ==
- Biogasoline
- Energy crop
- Asclepias
