= Motor fuel =

Drives the internal combustion engine

A motor fuel is a fuel that is used to provide power to the engine (motor) of vehicles — typically a heat engine that produces thermal energy via oxidative combustion of liquid or gaseous fuel and then converts the heat into mechanical energy through reciprocating pistons or gas turbines.

Currently, the majority of motor vehicles, powerboats and light aircraft worldwide are propelled by internal combustion engines powered by petroleum-based hydrocarbon fossil fuels such as gasoline, diesel or autogas, while larger ships and aircraft use marine diesel oil and kerosene to power gas/steam turbine, turboprop and jet engines. Other fuel types include ethanol, biodiesel, biogasoline, propane, compressed natural gas (CNG) and hydrogen (either using fuel cells or hydrogen combustion). There are also cars that use a hybrid drivetrain of different power sources. The use of synthetic alternative fuels (especially renewable biofuels) is increasing, especially in Europe, as well as increasing mass adoption of battery electric vehicles (which are powered by battery-stored electricity instead of fuels).

Before deciding on a particular fuel type, some factors should be considered:

- The profitability of a solution.
- The workload in relation to one's own driving performance - if someone drives short distances, he will have very little benefit for himself and the environment.
- The refueling / charging infrastructure should be sufficiently developed so that one can use its vehicle flexibly without worry about finding a filling station.

== See also ==
- Alternative fuel vehicle
- Biofuel
- Ethanol fuel
- Fuel gas
- Fuel oil
- Diesel fuel
