= Butanol fuel =

Fuel for internal combustion engines

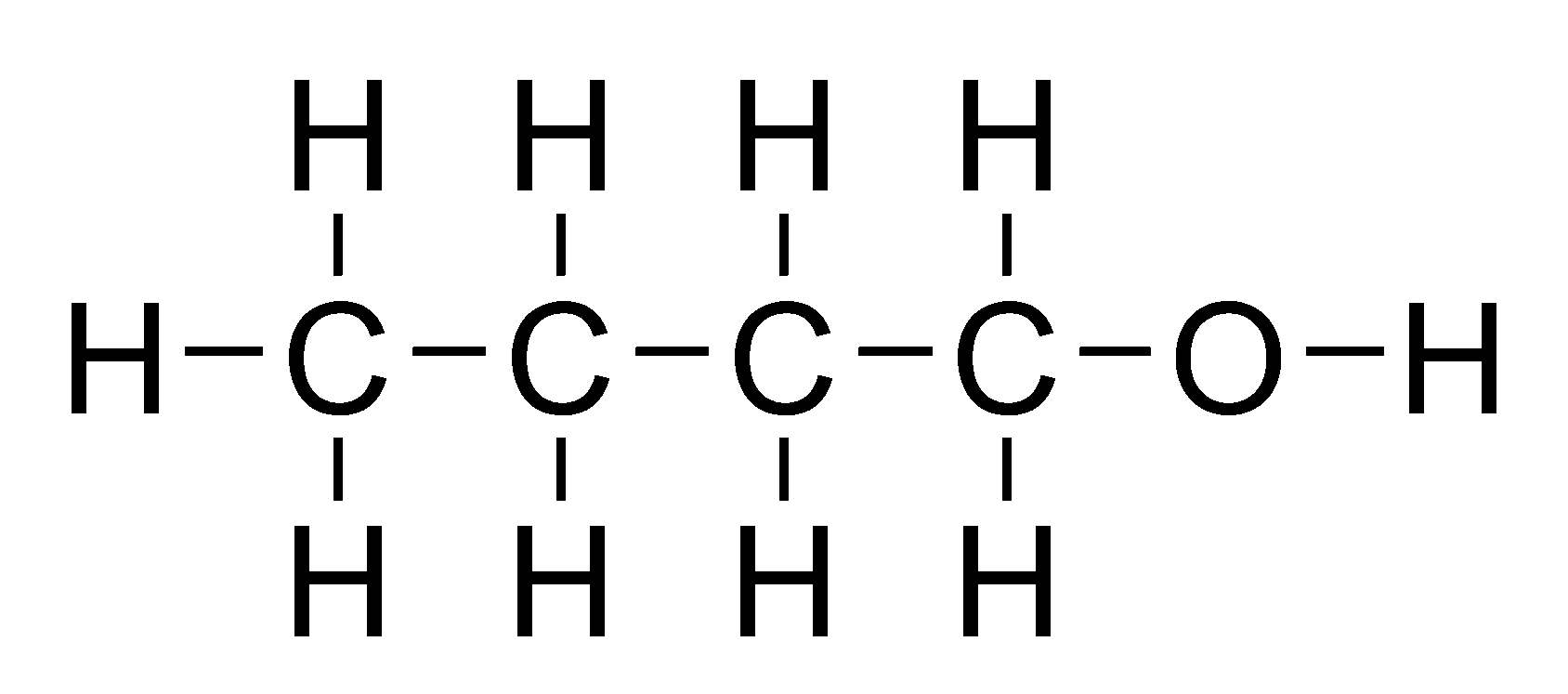
Butanol, a C-4 alcohol, is a promising bio-derived fuel, which shares many properties with gasoline.

Butanol may be used as a fuel in an internal combustion engine. It is more similar to gasoline than it is to ethanol. A C4-hydrocarbon, butanol is a drop-in fuel and thus works in vehicles designed for use with gasoline without modification. Both n-butanol and isobutanol have been studied as possible fuels. Both can be produced from biomass (as "biobutanol" ) as well as from fossil fuels (as "petrobutanol"). The chemical properties depend on the isomer (n-butanol or isobutanol), not on the production method.

== Genetically modified organisms ==
Obtaining higher yields of butanol involves manipulation of the metabolic networks using metabolic engineering and genetic engineering. While significant progress has been made, fermentation pathways for producing butanol remain inefficient. Titer and yields are low and separation is very expensive. As such, microbial production of butanol is not cost-competitive relative to petroleum-derived butanol.

Although unproven commercially, combining electrochemical and microbial production methods may offer a way to produce butanol from sustainable sources.

=== Escherichia coli ===
Escherichia coli, or E. coli, is a Gram-negative, rod-shaped bacterium. E. coli is the microorganism most likely to move on to commercial production of isobutanol. In its engineered form, E. coli produces the highest yields of isobutanol of any microorganism. Methods such as elementary mode analysis have been used to improve the metabolic efficiency of E. coli so that larger quantities of isobutanol may be produced. E. coli is an ideal isobutanol bio-synthesizer for several reasons:

- E. coli is an organism for which several tools of genetic manipulation exist, and it is an organism for which an extensive body of scientific literature exists. This wealth of knowledge allows E. coli to be easily modified by scientists.
- E. coli has the capacity to use lignocellulose (waste plant matter left over from agriculture) in the synthesis of isobutanol. The use of lignocellulose prevents E. coli from using plant matter meant for human consumption, and prevents any food-fuel price relationship which would occur from the biosynthesis of isobutanol by E. coli.
- Genetic modification has been used to broaden the scope of lignocellulose which can be used by E. coli. This has made E. coli a useful and diverse isobutanol bio-synthesizer.

The primary drawback of E. coli is that it is susceptible to bacteriophages when being grown. This susceptibility could potentially shut down entire bioreactors. Furthermore, the native reaction pathway for isobutanol in E. coli functions optimally at a limited concentration of isobutanol in the cell. To minimize the sensitivity of E. coli in high concentrations, mutants of the enzymes involved in synthesis can be generated by random mutagenesis. By chance, some mutants may prove to be more tolerant of isobutanol which will enhance the overall yield of the synthesis.

=== Clostridia ===
n-Butanol can be produced by fermentation of biomass by the A.B.E. process using Clostridium acetobutylicum, Clostridium beijerinckii. C. acetobutylicum was once used for the production of acetone from starch. The butanol was a by-product of fermentation (twice as much butanol was produced). The feedstocks for biobutanol are the same as those for ethanol: energy crops such as sugar beets, sugar cane, corn grain, wheat and cassava, prospective non-food energy crops such as switchgrass and even guayule in North America, as well as agricultural byproducts such as bagasse, straw and corn stalks. According to DuPont, existing bioethanol plants can cost-effectively be retrofitted to biobutanol production. Additionally, butanol production from biomass and agricultural byproducts could be more efficient (i.e. unit engine motive power delivered per unit solar energy consumed) than ethanol or methanol production.

A strain of Clostridium can convert nearly any form of cellulose into butanol even in the presence of oxygen.

A strain of Clostridium cellulolyticum, a native cellulose-degrading microbe, affords isobutanol directly from cellulose.

A combination of succinate and ethanol can be fermented to produce butyrate (a precursor to butanol fuel) by utilizing the metabolic pathways present in Clostridium kluyveri. Succinate is an intermediate of the TCA cycle, which metabolizes glucose. Anaerobic bacteria such as Clostridium acetobutylicum and Clostridium saccharobutylicum also contain these pathways. Succinate is first activated and then reduced by a two-step reaction to give 4-hydroxybutyrate, which is then metabolized further to crotonyl-coenzyme A (CoA). Crotonyl-CoA is then converted to butyrate. The genes corresponding to these butanol production pathways from Clostridium were cloned to E. coli.

=== Cyanobacteria ===
Cyanobacteria are a phylum of photosynthetic bacteria. They are suited for isobutanol biosynthesis when genetically engineered to produce isobutanol and its corresponding aldehydes. Isobutanol-producing species of cyanobacteria offer several advantages as biofuel synthesizers:

- Cyanobacteria grow faster than plants and also absorb sunlight more efficiently than plants. This means they can be replenished at a faster rate than the plant matter used for other biofuel biosynthesizers.
- Cyanobacteria can be grown on non-arable land (land not used for farming). This prevents competition between food sources and fuel sources.
- The supplements necessary for the growth of cyanobacteria are CO_{2}, H_{2}O, and sunlight. This presents two advantages:
  - Because CO_{2} is derived from the atmosphere, cyanobacteria do not need plant matter to synthesize isobutanol (in other organisms which synthesize isobutanol, plant matter is the source of the carbon necessary to synthetically assemble isobutanol). Since plant matter is not used by this method of isobutanol production, the necessity to source plant matter from food sources and create a food-fuel price relationship is avoided.
  - Because CO_{2} is absorbed from the atmosphere by cyanobacteria, the possibility of bioremediation (in the form of cyanobacteria removing excess CO_{2} from the atmosphere) exists.

The primary drawbacks of cyanobacteria are:

- They are sensitive to environmental conditions when being grown. Cyanobacteria suffer greatly from sunlight of inappropriate wavelength and intensity, CO_{2} of inappropriate concentration, or H_{2}O of inappropriate salinity, though a wealth of cyanobacteria are able to grow in brackish and marine waters. These factors are generally hard to control, and present a major obstacle in cyanobacterial production of isobutanol.
- Cyanobacteria bioreactors require high energy to operate. Cultures require constant mixing, and the harvesting of biosynthetic products is energy-intensive. This reduces the efficiency of isobutanol production via cyanobacteria.

Cyanobacteria can be re-engineered to increase their butanol production, showing the importance of ATP and cofactor driving forces as a design principle in pathway engineering. Many organisms have the capacity to produce butanol utilizing an acetyl-CoA dependent pathway. The main problem with this pathway is the first reaction involving the condensation of two acetyl-CoA molecules to acetoacetyl-CoA. This reaction is thermodynamically unfavorable due to the positive Gibbs free energy associated with it (dG = 6.8 kcal/mol).

=== Bacillus subtilis ===
Bacillus subtilis is a gram-positive rod-shaped bacteria. Bacillus subtilis offers many of the same advantages and disadvantages of E. coli, but it is less prominently used and does not produce isobutanol in quantities as large as E. coli. Similar to E. coli, B. subtilis is capable of producing isobutanol from lignocellulose, and is easily manipulated by common genetic techniques. Elementary mode analysis has also been used to improve the isobutanol-synthesis metabolic pathway used by B. subtilis, leading to higher yields of isobutanol being produced.

=== Saccharomyces cerevisiae ===
Saccharomyces cerevisiae, or S. cerevisiae, is a species of yeast. It naturally produces isobutanol in small quantities via its valine biosynthetic pathway. S. cerevisiae is an ideal candidate for isobutanol biofuel production for several reasons:

- S. cerevisiae can be grown at low pH levels, helping prevent contamination during growth in industrial bioreactors.
- S. cerevisiae cannot be affected by bacteriophages because it is a eukaryote.
- Extensive scientific knowledge about S. cerevisiae and its biology already exists.

Overexpression of the enzymes in the valine biosynthetic pathway of S. cerevisiae has been used to improve isobutanol yields. S. cerevisiae, however, has proved difficult to work with because of its inherent biology:

- As a eukaryote, S. cerevisiae is genetically more complex than E. coli or B. subtilis, and is harder to genetically manipulate as a result.
- S. cerevisiae has the natural ability to produce ethanol. This natural ability can "overpower" and consequently inhibit isobutanol production by S. cerevisiae.
- S. cerevisiae cannot use five-carbon sugars to produce isobutanol. The inability to use five-carbon sugars restricts S. cerevisiae from using lignocellulose, and means S. cerevisiae must use plant matter intended for human consumption to produce isobutanol. This results in an unfavorable food/fuel price relationship when isobutanol is produced by S. cerevisiae.

=== Ralstonia eutropha ===
Cupriavidus necator (=Ralstonia eutropha) is a Gram-negative soil bacterium of the class Betaproteobacteria. It is capable of indirectly converting electrical energy into isobutanol. This conversion is completed in several steps:

- Anodes are placed in a mixture of H_{2}O and CO_{2}.
- An electric current is run through the anodes, and through an electrochemical process H_{2}O and CO_{2} are combined to synthesize formic acid.
- A culture of C. necator (composed of a strain tolerant to electricity) is kept within the H_{2}O and CO_{2} mixture.
- The culture of C. necator then converts formic acid from the mixture into isobutanol.
- The biosynthesized isobutanol is then separated from the mixture, and can be used as a biofuel.

== Feedstocks ==
High cost of raw material is considered as one of the main obstacles to commercial production of butanols. Using inexpensive and abundant feedstocks, e.g., corn stover, could enhance the process economic viability.

Metabolic engineering can be used to allow an organism to use a cheaper substrate such as glycerol instead of glucose. Because fermentation processes require glucose derived from foods, butanol production can negatively impact food supply (see food vs fuel debate). Glycerol is a good alternative source for butanol production. While glucose sources are valuable and limited, glycerol is abundant and has a low market price because it is a waste product of biodiesel production. Butanol production from glycerol is economically viable using metabolic pathways that exist in the bacterium Clostridium pasteurianum.

=== Improving efficiency ===
A process called cloud point separation could allow the recovery of butanol with high efficiency.

== Producers and distribution ==
DuPont and BP plan to make biobutanol the first product of their joint effort to develop, produce, and market next-generation biofuels. In Europe the Swiss company Butalco is developing genetically modified yeasts for the production of biobutanol from cellulosic materials. Gourmet Butanol, a United States–based company, is developing a process that utilizes fungi to convert organic waste into biobutanol. Celtic Renewables makes biobutanol from waste that results from the production of whisky, and low-grade potatoes.

== Properties of common fuels ==
=== Isobutanol ===
Isobutanol is a second-generation biofuel with several qualities that resolve issues presented by ethanol.

Isobutanol's properties make it an attractive biofuel:

- relatively high energy density, 98% of that of gasoline.
- does not readily absorb water from air, preventing the corrosion of engines and pipelines.
- can be mixed at any proportion with gasoline, meaning the fuel can "drop into" the existing petroleum infrastructure as a replacement fuel or major additive.
- can be produced from plant matter not connected to food supplies, preventing a fuel-price/food-price relationship.
- assuming that it is produced from residual lignocellulosic feedstocks, blending isobutanol with gasoline may reduce GHG emissions considerably.

=== n-Butanol ===
Butanol better tolerates water contamination and is less corrosive than ethanol and more suitable for distribution through existing pipelines for gasoline. In blends with diesel or gasoline, butanol is less likely to separate from this fuel than ethanol if the fuel is contaminated with water. There is also a vapor pressure co-blend synergy with butanol and gasoline containing ethanol, which facilitates ethanol blending. This facilitates storage and distribution of blended fuels.

Fuel	Energy density	Air-fuel ratio	Specific energy	Heat of vaporization	RON	MON	AKI
Gasoline and biogasoline	32 MJ/L	14.7	2.9 MJ/kg air	0.36 MJ/kg	91–99	81–89	87-95
Butanol fuel	29.2 MJ/L	11.1	3.6 MJ/kg air	0.43 MJ/kg	96	78	87
Anhydrous Ethanol fuel	19.6 MJ/L	9.0	3.0 MJ/kg air	0.92 MJ/kg	107	89	98
Methanol fuel	16 MJ/L	6.4	3.1 MJ/kg air	1.2 MJ/kg	106	92	99

The octane rating of n-butanol is similar to that of gasoline but lower than that of ethanol and methanol. n-Butanol has a RON (Research Octane number) of 96 and a MON (Motor octane number) of 78 (with a resulting "(R+M)/2 pump octane number" of 87, as used in North America) while t-butanol has octane ratings of 105 RON and 89 MON. t-Butanol is used as an additive in gasoline but cannot be used as a fuel in its pure form because its relatively high melting point of 25.5 °C (79 °F) causes it to gel and solidify near room temperature. On the other hand, isobutanol has a lower melting point than n-butanol and favorable RON of 113 and MON of 94, and is thus much better suited to high fraction gasoline blends, blends with n-butanol, or as a standalone fuel.

A fuel with a higher octane rating is less prone to knocking (extremely rapid and spontaneous combustion by compression) and the control system of any modern car engine can take advantage of this by adjusting the ignition timing. This will improve energy efficiency, leading to a better fuel economy than the comparisons of energy content different fuels indicate. By increasing the compression ratio, further gains in fuel economy, power and torque can be achieved. Conversely, a fuel with lower octane rating is more prone to knocking and will lower efficiency. Knocking can also cause engine damage. Engines designed to run on 87 octane will not have any additional power/fuel economy from being operated with higher octane fuel.

==== Butanol characteristics: air-fuel ratio, specific energy, viscosity, specific heat ====
Alcohol fuels, including butanol and ethanol, are partially oxidized and therefore need to run at richer mixtures than gasoline. Standard gasoline engines in cars can adjust the air-fuel ratio to accommodate variations in the fuel, but only within certain limits depending on model. If the limit is exceeded by running the engine on pure ethanol or a gasoline blend with a high percentage of ethanol, the engine will run lean, something which can critically damage components. Compared to ethanol, butanol can be mixed in higher ratios with gasoline for use in existing cars without the need for retrofit as the air-fuel ratio and energy content are closer to that of gasoline.

Alcohol fuels have less energy per unit weight and unit volume than gasoline. To make it possible to compare the net energy released per cycle a measure called the fuels specific energy is sometimes used. It is defined as the energy released per air fuel ratio. The net energy released per cycle is higher for butanol than ethanol or methanol and about 10% higher than for gasoline.

Substance	Kinematic viscosity at 20 °C
Butanol	3.64 cSt
Diesel	>3 cSt
Ethanol	1.52 cSt
Water	1.0 cSt
Methanol	0.64 cSt
Gasoline	0.4–0.8 cSt

The viscosity of alcohols increase with longer carbon chains. For this reason, butanol is used as an alternative to shorter alcohols when a more viscous solvent is desired. The kinematic viscosity of butanol is several times higher than that of gasoline and about as viscous as high quality diesel fuel.

The fuel in an engine has to be vaporized before it will burn. Insufficient vaporization is a known problem with alcohol fuels during cold starts in cold weather. As the heat of vaporization of butanol is less than half of that of ethanol, an engine running on butanol should be easier to start in cold weather than one running on ethanol or methanol.

==== Butanol fuel mixtures ====
Standards for the blending of ethanol and methanol in gasoline exist in many countries, including the EU, the US, and Brazil. Approximate equivalent butanol blends can be calculated from the relations between the stoichiometric fuel-air ratio of butanol, ethanol and gasoline. Common ethanol fuel mixtures for fuel sold as gasoline currently range from 5% to 10%. It is estimated that around 9.5 gigaliter (Gl) of gasoline can be saved and about 64.6 Gl of butanol-gasoline blend 16% (Bu16) can potentially be produced from corn residues in the US, which is equivalent to 11.8% of total domestic gasoline consumption.

Consumer acceptance may be limited due to the potentially offensive banana-like smell of n-butanol. Plans are underway to market a fuel that is 85% ethanol and 15% butanol (E85B), so existing E85 internal combustion engines can run on a 100% renewable fuel that could be made without using any fossil fuels. Because its longer hydrocarbon chain causes it to be fairly non-polar, it is more similar to gasoline than it is to ethanol. Butanol has been demonstrated to work in vehicles designed for use with gasoline without modification.

==== Butanol in vehicles ====
Currently no production vehicle is known to be approved by the manufacturer for use with 100% butanol. As of early 2009, only a few vehicles are approved for even using E85 fuel (i.e. 85% ethanol + 15% gasoline) in the USA. However, in Brazil all vehicle manufacturers (Fiat, Ford, VW, GM, Toyota, Honda, Peugeot, Citroen and others) produce "flex-fuel" vehicles that can run on 100% Gasoline or 100% on Ethanol or any mix of Gasoline and ethanol. These flex fuel cars represent 90% of the sales of personal vehicles in Brazil, in 2009. BP and DuPont, engaged in a joint venture to produce and promote butanol fuel, claim that "biobutanol can be blended up to 10%v/v in European gasoline and 11.5%v/v in US gasoline". In the 2009 Petit Le Mans race, the No. 16 Lola B09/86 - Mazda MZR-R of Dyson Racing ran on a mixture of biobutanol and ethanol developed by team technology partner BP.

== See also ==
- Alcohol to jet fuel
- Air-fuel ratio
- Bioalcohol
- Biofuel
- Biodiesel
- Biohydrogen
- Bioconversion of biomass to mixed alcohol fuels
- Butanol
- Catalyst
- Dimethyl ether
- Distillation
- Emission standards
- Energy crop
- Ethanol fuel
- Formic acid: can be used as an intermediary to produce isobutanol from CO_{2} using microbes
- Gevo Biofuels
- Industrial fermentation
- List of vegetable oils used for biofuel
