= Cobalt Technologies =

- Company type: Private
- Industry: Chemical & Fuel
- Founded: 1 January 2005
- Headquarters: 500 Clyde Avenue, Mountain View, CA 94043
- Key people: Bob Mayer (CEO), Andy Meyer (President), "Carole Cobb" (COO), David Walther (VP R&D)

Cobalt Technologies was a Mountain View start-up that specialized in the creation of biobutanol using various cellulosic feedstocks. Past feedstocks included corn cobs, treetops and limbs, and dead pine trees from pine beetles. It was run by CEO Bob Mayer and President Andy Meyer.

== Company History ==
Cobalt raised a $25 million Series C in 2008, co-led by LSP and Pinnacle Ventures. New investors included Harris and Harris. Later that year, Cobalt named Rick Wilson as chief executive officer.

In 2009, Cobalt was named to Global Cleantech 100 by Guardian News and Media and Cleantech Group

In 2010, Cobalt Technologies demonstrated renewable biobutanol fuel from beetle-killed lodgepole pine trees. To evaluate the fuel's viability for commercial vehicles, the company has signed a fuel testing partnership with Colorado State University. Cobalt was named to the Biofuels Digest "30 Most Transformative Technologies of 2010" and ranked first in the competitive biobutanol category.

In 2015, Cobalt Technologies' assets were liquidated in a forced sale.
