= Poly(butyl acrylate) =

Identifiers
CAS Number	9003-49-0
ECHA InfoCard	100.131.325
UNII	705NM8U35V
CompTox Dashboard (EPA)	DTXSID80233177 DTXSID601009738, DTXSID80233177

Properties
Appearance	colorless solid
Density	1.06 g/cm^{3}
Refractive index (n_{D})	1.474
- Except where otherwise noted, data are given for materials in their standard state (at 25 °C [77 °F], 100 kPa). Infobox references

Poly(butyl acrylate) (PBA) is a family of organic polymers with the formula (CH_{2}CHCO_{2}CH_{2}CH_{2}CH_{2}CH_{3})_{n}. It is a synthetic acrylate polymer derived from butyl acrylate monomer. The polymers are colorless. This homopolymer is far less important than copolymers derived from methyl acrylate and other monomers. It has a low glass-transition temperature of about -43 °C.

== Copolymers ==
Far more important than PBA are copolymers produced from butyl acrylate and one or more of the following comonomers methyl methacrylate, styrene, acrylonitrile, vinyl acetate, vinyl chloride, vinylidene chloride, and butadiene.
