= Butyl ester =

Butyl ester may refer to:

- Butyl nitrite
- The family of organic chemical compounds containing an ester group and a butyl group including:
  - Butyl acetate
  - Butyl acrylate
  - Butyl butyrate
  - Butyl cyanoacrylate
  - Butyl methacrylate
  - Dibutyl phthalate
