= Celtic Renewables =

Scottish sustainable biofuel producer

Celtic Renewables Ltd
- Industry: Biofuels
- Founded: 25 January 2012
- Founder: Professor Martin Tangney OBE
- Headquarters: Edinburgh, Scotland, United Kingdom
- Key people: Mark Simmers (CEO),
- Products: Biobutanol; Acetone; Bioethanol; High grade animal feed
- Website: www.celtic-renewables.com

Celtic Renewables Ltd. is the first company to produce biofuel from the by-products of the scotch whisky industry.

It has been estimated that annually the whisky industry produces 1.6 billion litres of pot ale and 500,000 tonnes of draff which has historically been used for animal feed. Celtic Renewables has utilised these resources and adapted the traditional Weizmann Fermentation process (also known as ABE fermentation) to produce Biobutanol.

Several supply partnerships have been established with local distilleries along with a relationship with Europe’s biotech flagship Bio Base Europe where it has piloted its biofuel production process with a £1 million grant from the Department of Energy and Climate Change (DECC). The company also carries the support of the Scotch Whisky Association and the Scottish Government, where this process is well aligned to both national biofuel and carbon reduction targets.

The company was granted planning permission for its first scale biorefinery at Caledon Green, in Grangemouth, Scotland in 2020 and completed building in November 2021, there are now plans for a second in Speyside.

== Inception ==
Celtic Renewables was created by Professor Martin Tangney OBE, who is also the Director of the Biofuel Research Centre at Edinburgh Napier University. It was launched on 25 January 2012, at the University’s Sighthill Campus by Fergus Ewing, Minister for Energy, Enterprise and Tourism and Lena Wilson, Chief Executive of Scottish Enterprise. Dr. Doug Ward, founder of Argent Energy, was appointed as its inaugural Chairman. Mark Simmers, fellow from The Saltire Foundation, is CEO.
