= 2-Butanol =

Secondary alcohol CH3CH(OH)CH2CH3

- Skeletal formula of 2-butanol

Names
- Preferred IUPAC name Butan-2-ol
- Other names sec-Butanol sec-Butyl alcohol 2-Butanol; 2-Butyl alcohol

Identifiers
CAS Number	78-92-2; 14898-79-4 (R); 4221-99-2 (S)
3D model (JSmol)	Interactive image; (R): Interactive image; (S): Interactive image
Abbreviations	s-BuOH sBuOH^{s}BuOH
Beilstein Reference	773649 1718764 (R); 1718763 (S)
ChEBI	CHEBI:35687
ChEMBL	ChEMBL45462
ChemSpider	6320; 76392 (R); 392543 (S)
DrugBank	DB02606
ECHA InfoCard	100.001.053
EC Number	201-158-5
Gmelin Reference	1686 396584 (R); 25655 (S)
MeSH	2-butanol
PubChem CID	6568; 84682 (R); 444683 (S)
RTECS number	EO1750000
UNII	0TUL3ENK62; DLH38K423J (R); 69KXU5NDTO (S)
UN number	1120
CompTox Dashboard (EPA)	DTXSID9021762
- InChI: InChI=1S/C4H10O/c1-3-4(2)5/h4-5H,3H2,1-2H3 Key: BTANRVKWQNVYAZ-UHFFFAOYSA-N
- SMILES: CCC(C)O; (R): CC[C@@H](C)O; (S): CC[C@H](C)O

Properties
Chemical formula	C_{4}H_{10}O
Molar mass	74.123 g·mol^{−1}
Density	0.808 g cm^{−3}
Melting point	−115 °C; −175 °F; 158 K
Boiling point	98 to 100 °C; 208 to 212 °F; 371 to 373 K
Solubility in water	390 g/L
log P	0.683
Vapor pressure	1.67 kPa (at 20 °C)
Acidity (pK_{a})	17.6
Magnetic susceptibility (χ)	−5.7683×10^{−5} cm^{3} mol^{−1}
Refractive index (n_{D})	1.3978 (at 20 °C)

Thermochemistry
Heat capacity (C)	197.1 J K^{−1} mol^{−1}
Std molar entropy (S^{⦵}_{298})	213.1 J K^{−1} mol^{−1}
Std enthalpy of formation (Δ_{f}H^{⦵}_{298})	−343.3 to −342.1 kJ mol^{−1}
Std enthalpy of combustion (Δ_{c}H^{⦵}_{298})	−2.6611 to −2.6601 MJ mol^{−1}

Hazards
- GHS labelling
Pictograms	(GHS02: Flammable) (GHS07: Exclamation mark)
Signal word	Warning
Hazard statements	H226, H319, H335, H336
Precautionary statements	P261, P305+P351+P338
NFPA 704 (fire diamond)	1 3 0
Flash point	22 to 27 °C (72 to 81 °F; 295 to 300 K)
Autoignition temperature	405 °C (761 °F; 678 K)
Explosive limits	1.7–9.8%
- Lethal dose or concentration (LD, LC)
LC_{Lo} (lowest published)	16,000 ppm (rat, 4 hr); 10,670 ppm (mouse, 3.75 hr); 16,000 ppm (mouse, 2.67 hr)
- NIOSH (US health exposure limits)
PEL (Permissible)	TWA 150 ppm (450 mg/m^{3})
REL (Recommended)	TWA 100 ppm (305 mg/m^{3}) ST 150 ppm (455 mg/m^{3})
IDLH (Immediate danger)	2000 ppm
Safety data sheet (SDS)	inchem.org

Related compounds
Related butanols	n-Butanol; Isobutanol tert-Butanol
Related compounds	Butanone
- Except where otherwise noted, data are given for materials in their standard state (at 25 °C [77 °F], 100 kPa). verify (what is ?) Infobox references

Butan-2-ol, or sec-butanol, is an organic compound with formula CH_{3}CH(OH)CH_{2}CH_{3}. Its structural isomers are 1-butanol, isobutanol, and tert-butanol. 2-Butanol is chiral and thus can be obtained as either of two stereoisomers designated as (R)-(−)-butan-2-ol and (S)-(+)-butan-2-ol. It is normally encountered as a 1:1 mixture of the two stereoisomers — a racemic mixture.

This secondary alcohol is a flammable, colorless liquid that is soluble in three parts water and completely miscible with organic solvents. It is produced on a large scale, primarily as a precursor to the industrial solvent methyl ethyl ketone.

(R)-(−)-2-butanol	(S)-(+)-2-butanol

== Manufacture and applications ==
Butan-2-ol is manufactured industrially by the hydration of 1-butene or 2-butene:

Sulfuric acid is used as a catalyst for this conversion.

In the laboratory it can be prepared via Grignard reaction by reacting ethylmagnesium bromide with acetaldehyde in dried diethyl ether or tetrahydrofuran.

Although some butan-2-ol is used as a solute, it is mainly converted to butanone (methyl ethyl ketone, MEK), an important industrial solvent and found in many domestic cleaning agents and paint removers. Though most paint removers have ceased using MEK in their products due to health concerns and new laws. Volatile esters of butan-2-ol have pleasant aromas and are used in small amounts as perfumes or in artificial flavors.

== Solubility ==
The listed solubility of butan-2-ol is often incorrect, including some of the most well-known references such as the Merck Index, the CRC Handbook of Chemistry and Physics, and Lange's Handbook of Chemistry. Even the International Programme on Chemical Safety lists the wrong solubility. This widespread error originated because of Beilstein's Handbuch der Organischen Chemie (Handbook of Organic Chemistry). This work cites a false solubility of 12.5 g/100 g water. Many other sources used this solubility, which has snowballed into a widespread error in the industrial world. The correct data (35.0 g/100 g at 20 °C, 29 g/100 g at 25 °C, and 22 g/100 g at 30 °C) were first published in 1886 by Alexejew and then similar data was reported by other scientists including Dolgolenko and Dryer in 1907 and 1913, respectively.

== Precautions ==
Like other butanols, butan-2-ol has low acute toxicity. The LD_{50} is 4400 mg/kg (rat, oral).

Several explosions have been reported during the conventional distillation of 2-butanol, apparently due to the buildup of peroxides with the boiling point higher than that of pure alcohol (and therefore concentrating in the still pot during distillation). As alcohols, unlike ethers, are not widely known to be capable of forming peroxide impurities, the danger is likely to be overlooked. 2-Butanol is in Class B Peroxide Forming Chemicals.
