= Isobutanol =

Chemical compound (CH3)2CHCH2OH

Isobutanol (2-Methyl-propan-1-ol)
- Skeletal formula of isobutanol

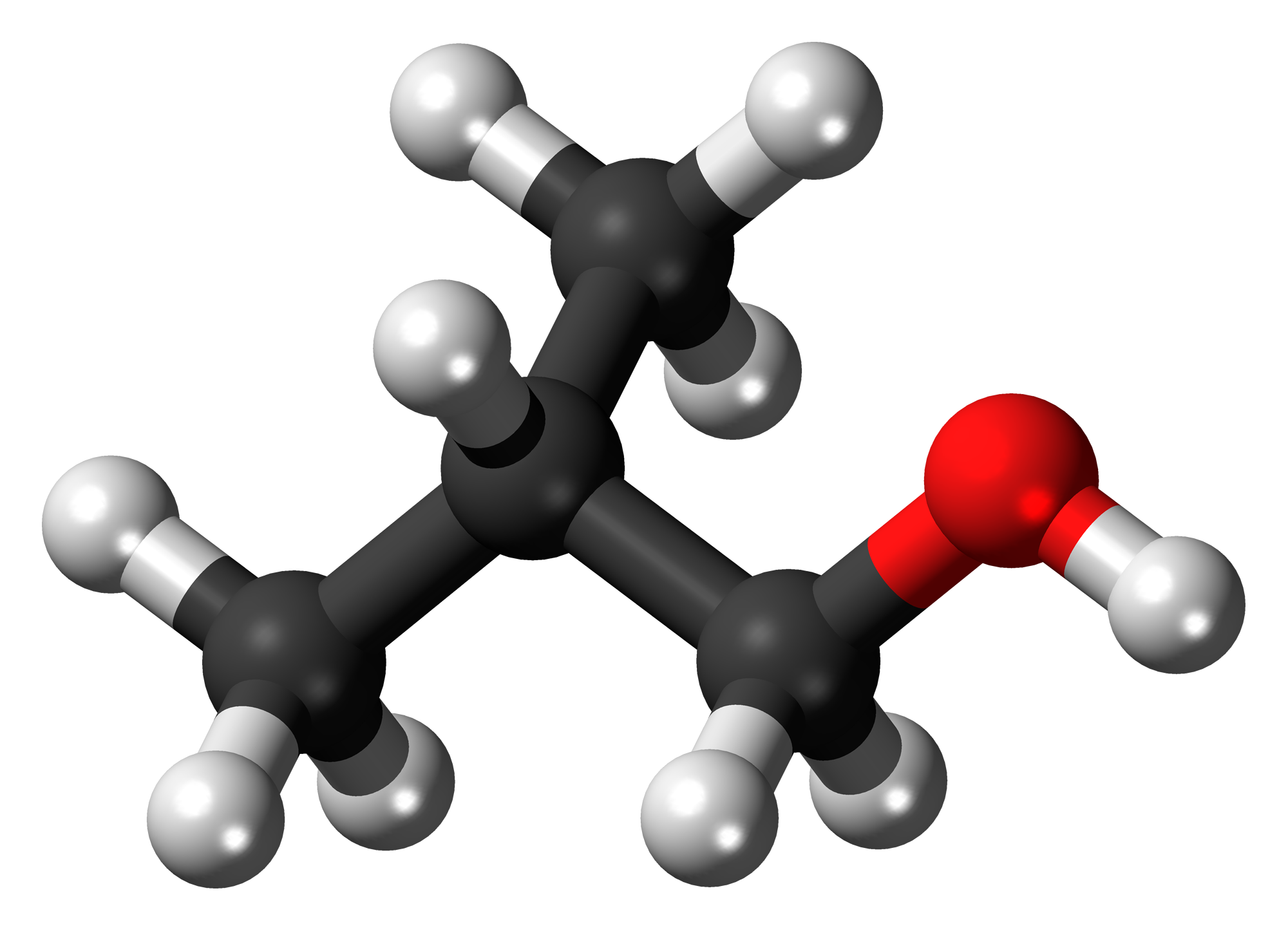
- Ball-and-stick model of isobutanol

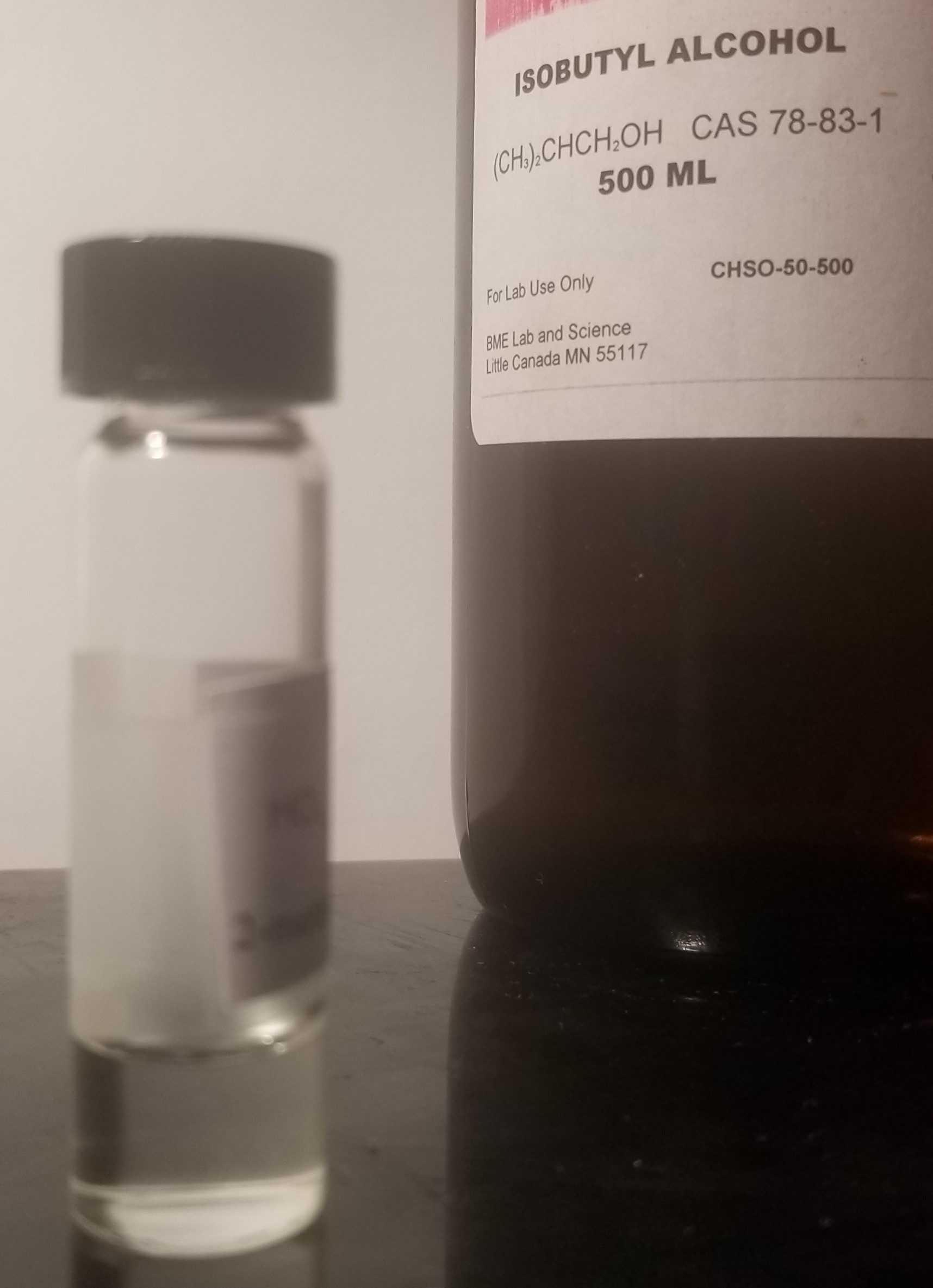

Names
- Preferred IUPAC name 2-Methylpropan-1-ol
- Other names Isobutyl alcohol Isobutanol; 2-Methyl-1-propanol; 2-Methylpropyl alcohol Isopropylcarbinol

Identifiers
CAS Number	78-83-1
3D model (JSmol)	Interactive image
Abbreviations	IBA i-BuOH iBuOH^{i}BuOH
Beilstein Reference	1730878
ChEBI	CHEBI:46645
ChEMBL	ChEMBL269630
ChemSpider	6312
ECHA InfoCard	100.001.044
EC Number	201-148-0
Gmelin Reference	49282
KEGG	C14710
PubChem CID	6560
RTECS number	NP9625000
UNII	56F9Z98TEM
UN number	1212
CompTox Dashboard (EPA)	DTXSID0021759
- InChI: InChI=1S/C4H10O/c1-4(2)3-5/h4-5H,3H2,1-2H3 Key: ZXEKIIBDNHEJCQ-UHFFFAOYSA-N; InChI=1/C4H10O/c1-4(2)3-5/h4-5H,3H2,1-2H3
- SMILES: CC(C)CO

Properties
Chemical formula	C_{4}H_{10}O
Molar mass	74.123 g·mol^{−1}
Appearance	Colorless liquid
Odor	sweet, musty
Density	0.802 g/cm^{3}, liquid
Melting point	−108 °C (−162 °F; 165 K)
Boiling point	107.89 °C (226.20 °F; 381.04 K)
Solubility in water	8.7 mL/100 mL
log P	0.8
Vapor pressure	9 mmHg (20°C)
Refractive index (n_{D})	1.3959
Viscosity	3.95 cP at 20 °C

Hazards
- GHS labelling
Pictograms	(GHS02: Flammable) (GHS07: Exclamation mark)
Signal word	Danger
Hazard statements	H226, H315, H318, H335, H336
Precautionary statements	P210, P233, P240, P241, P242, P243, P261, P264, P271, P280, P302+P352, P303+P361+P353, P304+P340, P305+P351+P338, P310, P312, P321, P332+P313, P362, P370+P378, P403+P233, P403+P235, P405, P501
NFPA 704 (fire diamond)	1 3 0
Flash point	28 °C (82 °F; 301 K)
Autoignition temperature	415 °C (779 °F; 688 K)
Explosive limits	1.7–10.9%
- Lethal dose or concentration (LD, LC)
LD_{Lo} (lowest published)	3750 mg/kg (rabbit, oral); 2460 mg/kg (rat, oral)
- NIOSH (US health exposure limits)
PEL (Permissible)	TWA 100 ppm (300 mg/m^{3})
REL (Recommended)	TWA 50 ppm (150 mg/m^{3})
IDLH (Immediate danger)	1600 ppm
Safety data sheet (SDS)	ICSC 0113

Related compounds
Related butanols	1-Butanol sec-Butanol tert-Butanol
Related compounds	Isobutyraldehyde; Isobutyric acid
- Except where otherwise noted, data are given for materials in their standard state (at 25 °C [77 °F], 100 kPa). verify (what is ?) Infobox references

Isobutanol (IUPAC nomenclature: 2-methylpropan-1-ol) is an organic compound with the formula (CH_{3})_{2}CHCH_{2}OH (sometimes represented as i-BuOH). This colorless, flammable liquid with a characteristic smell is mainly used as a solvent either directly or as its esters. Its isomers are 1-butanol, 2-butanol, and tert-butanol, all of which are important industrially.

== History and occurrence ==
Fusel alcohols including isobutanol are grain fermentation byproducts. Therefore, trace amounts of isobutanol may be present in many alcoholic beverages.

In 1852 Charles Adolphe Wurtz subjected such alcohols to fractional distillation and identified in some of them a butylic alcohol boiling at around 108°C. Its structure was initially unclear, with some chemists believing it corresponded to butyric acid, but theoretical considerations indicated that normal butanol should have a higher boiling point, and in 1867 Emil Erlenmeyer and independently Vladimir Markovnikov determined its actual structure by proving its oxidation product to be isobutyric acid.

== Production ==
Isobutanol is produced by the carbonylation of propylene. Two methods are practiced industrially, hydroformylation is more common and generates a mixture of isobutyraldehyde and butyraldehyde:

CH_{3}CH=CH_{2} + CO + H_{2} → CH_{3}CH_{2}CH_{2}CHO

The reaction is catalyzed by cobalt or rhodium complexes. The resulting aldehydes are hydrogenated to the alcohols, which are then separated. In Reppe carbonylation, the same products are obtained, but the hydrogenation is effected by the water-gas shift reaction.

=== Laboratory synthesis ===
Propanol and methanol can be reacted to produce isobutyl alcohol via Guerbet condensation.

=== Biosynthesis of isobutanol ===
E. coli as well as several other organisms has been genetically modified to produce C4 alcohols from glucose, including isobutanol, 1-butanol, 2-methyl-1-butanol, 3-methyl-1-butanol, and 2-phenylethanol. The host's highly active amino acid biosynthetic pathway is shifted to alcohol production. α-Ketoisovalerate, derived from valine, is prone to decarboxylation to give isobutyraldehyde, which is susceptible to reduction to the alcohol:

(CH_{3})_{2}CHC(O)CO_{2}H → (CH_{3})_{2}CHCHO + CO_{2}
(CH_{3})_{2}CHCHO + NADH + H^{+} → (CH_{3})_{2}CHCH_{2}OH + NAD^{+}

== Applications ==
The uses of isobutanol and 1-butanol are similar. They are often used interchangeably. The main applications are as varnishes and precursors to esters, which are useful solvents, e.g. isobutyl acetate. Isobutyl esters of phthalic, adipic, and related dicarboxylic acids are common plasticizers. Isobutanol is also a component of some biofuels.

== Safety and regulation ==
Isobutanol is one of the least toxic of the butanols with an LD_{50} of 2460 mg/kg (rat, oral).

In March 2009, the Government of Canada announced a ban on isobutanol use in cosmetics.
