= Butanol =

Chemical compound family ( C4H9OH)

Butanol (also called butyl alcohol) is a four-carbon alcohol with a formula of C_{4}H_{9}OH, which occurs in five isomeric structures (four structural isomers), from a straight-chain primary alcohol to a branched-chain tertiary alcohol; all are a butyl or isobutyl group linked to a hydroxyl group (sometimes represented as BuOH, sec-BuOH, i-BuOH, and t-BuOH). These are 1-butanol, two stereoisomers of sec-butyl alcohol, isobutanol and tert-butyl alcohol. Butanol is primarily used as a solvent and as an intermediate in chemical synthesis, and may be used as a fuel. Biologically produced butanol is called biobutanol, which may be n-butanol or isobutanol.

== Isomers ==
The unmodified term butanol usually refers to the straight chain isomer with the alcohol functional group at the terminal carbon, which is also known as 1-butanol. The straight chain isomer with the alcohol at an internal carbon is sec-butyl alcohol or 2-butanol. The branched isomer with the alcohol at a terminal carbon is isobutanol or 2-methyl-1-propanol, and the branched isomer with the alcohol at the internal carbon is tert-butyl alcohol or 2-methyl-2-propanol.

1-Butanol (n-butanol)	2-Butanol (sec-butyl alcohol)	Isobutanol (2-methylpropan-1-ol)	tert-butyl alcohol (2-methylpropan-2-ol)

The butanol isomers have different melting and boiling points. 1-Butanol and isobutanol have limited solubility, sec-butyl alcohol has substantially greater solubility, whereas tert-butyl alcohol is miscible with water. The hydroxyl group makes the molecule polar, promoting solubility in water, while the longer hydrocarbon chain mitigates the polarity and reduces solubility.

== Toxicity ==
Butanol exhibits a low order of toxicity in single dose experiments with laboratory animals and is considered safe enough for use in cosmetics. Brief, repeated overexposure with the skin can result in depression of the central nervous system, as with other short-chain alcohols. Exposure may also cause severe eye irritation and moderate skin irritation. The main dangers are from prolonged exposure to the alcohol's vapors. In extreme cases this includes suppression of the central nervous system and even death. Under most circumstances, butanol is quickly metabolized to carbon dioxide. It has not been shown to damage DNA or cause cancer.

== Uses ==
=== Primary uses ===
Butanol is used as a solvent for a wide variety of chemical and textile processes, in organic synthesis, and as a chemical intermediate. It is also used as a paint thinner and a solvent in other coating applications where a relatively slow evaporating latent solvent is preferable, as with lacquers and ambient-cured enamels. It is also used as a component of hydraulic and brake fluids.

A 50% solution of butanol in water has been used since the 20th century to retard the drying of fresh plaster in fresco painting. The solution is usually sprayed on the wet plaster after the plaster has been trowelled smooth and extends the working period during which frescos can be painted up to 18 hours.

Butanol is used in the synthesis of 2-butoxyethanol. A major application for butanol is as a reactant with acrylic acid to produce butyl acrylate, a primary ingredient of water based acrylic paint.

It is also used as a base for perfumes, but on its own has a highly alcoholic aroma.

Salts of butanol are chemical intermediates; for example, alkali metal salts of tert-butanol are tert-butoxides.

== Biobutanol ==
Butanol (n-butanol or isobutanol) is a potential biofuel (butanol fuel). Butanol at 85 percent concentration can be used in cars designed for gasoline (petrol) without any change to the engine (unlike 85% ethanol), and it contains more energy for a given volume than ethanol and almost as much as gasoline, and a vehicle using butanol would return fuel consumption more comparable to gasoline than ethanol. Butanol can also be added to diesel fuel to reduce soot emissions. Photoautotrophic microorganisms, like cyanobacteria, can be engineered to produce 1-butanol indirectly from CO_{2} and water.

== Production ==
Butanols are normally present in fusel alcohol.

Since the 1950s, most butanol in the United States is produced commercially from fossil fuels. The most common process starts with propene (propylene), which is put through a hydroformylation reaction to form butanal, which is then reduced with hydrogen to 1-butanol and/or 2-butanol. tert-butanol is derived from isobutane as a co-product of propylene oxide production.

Butanol can also be produced by fermentation of biomass by bacteria. Prior to the 1950s, Clostridium acetobutylicum was used in industrial fermentation to produce n-butanol.

== See also ==
- A.B.E. process
- Algal fuel
