= Tert-Butyl alcohol =

tert-Butyl alcohol
Skeletal formula of tert-butyl alcohol
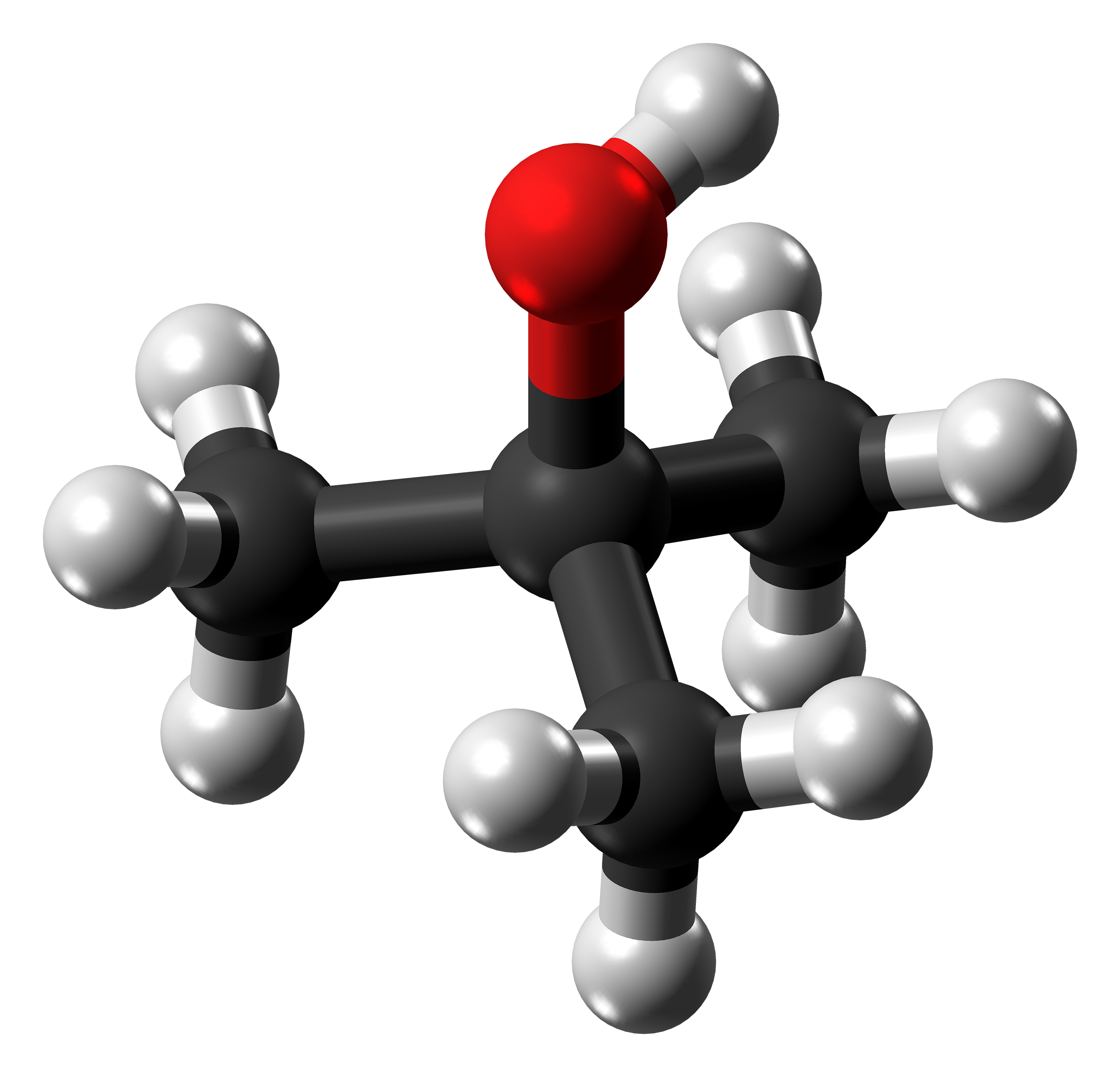
Ball and stick model of tert-butyl alcohol
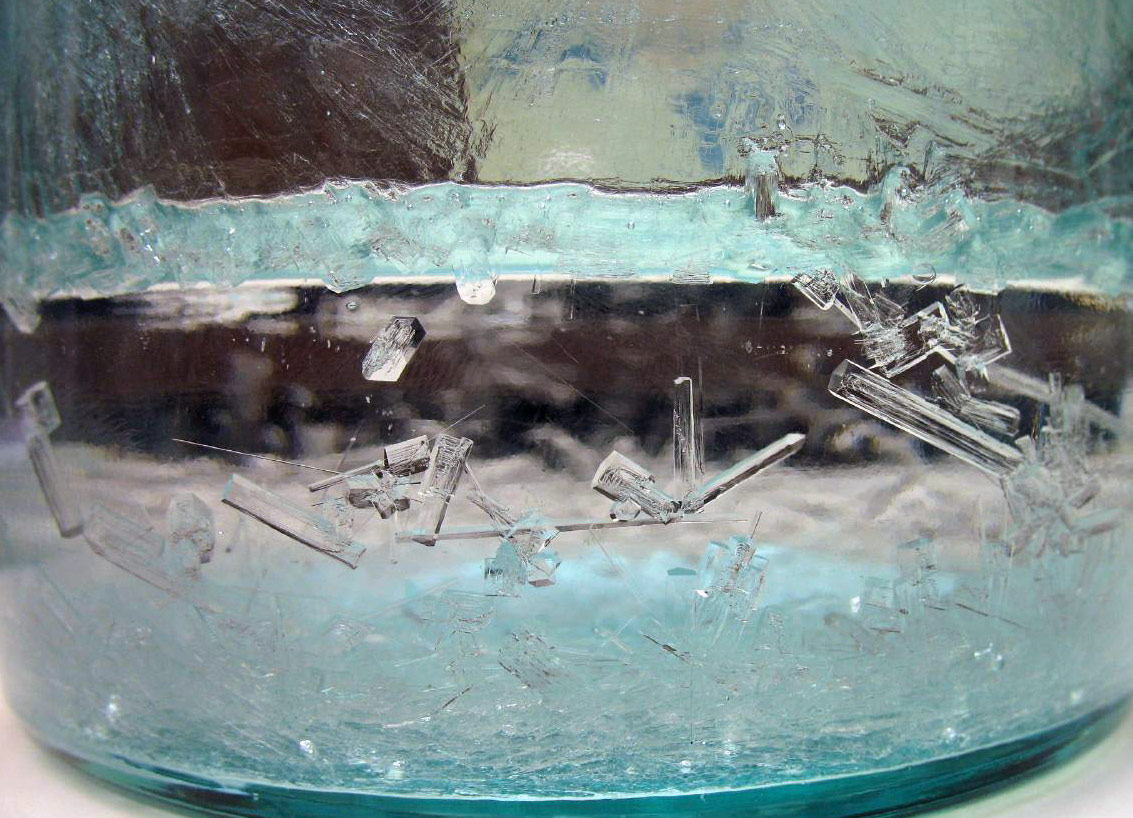
- Sample of partially crystallized tert-butyl alcohol

Names
- Preferred IUPAC name 2-Methylpropan-2-ol
- Other names: t-Butyl alcohol; tert-Butanol; t-Butanol; Trimethyl carbinol; Tertiary butanol; 2-Methyl-2-propanol; 2M2P

Identifiers
CAS Number	75-65-0
3D model (JSmol)	Interactive image
Abbreviations	Me_{3}COH t-BuOH tBuOH^{t}BuOH
Beilstein Reference	906698
ChEBI	CHEBI:45895
ChEMBL	ChEMBL16502
ChemSpider	6146
DrugBank	DB03900
ECHA InfoCard	100.000.809
EC Number	200-889-7
Gmelin Reference	1833
MeSH	tert-Butyl+Alcohol
PubChem CID	6386
RTECS number	EO1925000
UNII	MD83SFE959
UN number	1120
CompTox Dashboard (EPA)	DTXSID8020204
- InChI: InChI=1S/C4H10O/c1-4(2,3)5/h5H,1-3H3 Key: DKGAVHZHDRPRBM-UHFFFAOYSA-N
- SMILES: CC(C)(C)O

Properties
Chemical formula	C_{4}H_{10}O
Molar mass	74.123 g·mol^{−1}
Appearance	Colorless solid
Odor	Camphorous
Density	0.775 g/mL
Melting point	25 to 26 °C; 77 to 79 °F; 298 to 299 K
Boiling point	82 to 83 °C; 179 to 181 °F; 355 to 356 K
Solubility in water	miscible
Solubility	Miscible with ethanol and diethyl ether
log P	0.584
Vapor pressure	4.1 kPa (at 20 °C)
Acidity (pK_{a})	16.54
Magnetic susceptibility (χ)	5.742×10^{−5} cm^{3}/mol
Refractive index (n_{D})	1.387
Dipole moment	1.31 D

Thermochemistry
Heat capacity (C)	215.37 J/(K·mol)
Std molar entropy (S^{⦵}_{298})	189.5 J/(K·mol)
Std enthalpy of formation (Δ_{f}H^{⦵}_{298})	−360.04 to −358.36 kJ/mol
Std enthalpy of combustion (Δ_{c}H^{⦵}_{298})	−2.64479 to −2.64321 MJ/mol

Hazards
- GHS labelling
Pictograms	(GHS02: Flammable) (GHS07: Exclamation mark)
Signal word	Danger
Hazard statements	H225, H319, H332, H335
Precautionary statements	P210, P261, P305+P351+P338
NFPA 704 (fire diamond)	2 3 0
Flash point	11 °C (52 °F; 284 K)
Autoignition temperature	480 °C (896 °F; 753 K)
Explosive limits	2.4–8.0%
- Lethal dose or concentration (LD, LC)
LD_{50} (median dose)	3559 mg/kg (rabbit, oral); 3500 mg/kg (rat, oral)
- NIOSH (US health exposure limits)
PEL (Permissible)	TWA 100 ppm (300 mg/m^{3})
REL (Recommended)	TWA 100 ppm (300 mg/m^{3}) ST 150 ppm (450 mg/m^{3})
IDLH (Immediate danger)	1600 ppm
Safety data sheet (SDS)	inchem.org

Related compounds
Related butanols	2-Butanol; n-Butanol; Isobutanol
Related compounds	2-Methyl-2-butanol; Trimethylsilanol; Nonafluoro-tert-butyl alcohol
- Except where otherwise noted, data are given for materials in their standard state (at 25 °C [77 °F], 100 kPa). verify (what is ?) Infobox references

tert-Butyl alcohol is the simplest tertiary alcohol, with a formula of (CH_{3})_{3}COH (sometimes represented as t-BuOH). Its isomers are 1-butanol, isobutanol, and 2-butanol. tert-Butyl alcohol is a colorless solid, which melts near room temperature and has a camphor-like odor. It is miscible with water, ethanol and diethyl ether.

== Natural occurrence ==
tert-Butyl alcohol has been identified in beer and chickpeas. It is also found in cassava, which is used as a fermentation ingredient in certain alcoholic beverages.

== Preparation ==
tert-Butyl alcohol is derived commercially from isobutane as a coproduct of propylene oxide production. It can also be produced by the catalytic hydration of isobutylene, or by a Grignard reaction between acetone and methylmagnesium chloride.

Purification cannot be performed by simple distillation due to formation of an azeotrope with water, although initial drying of the solvent containing large amounts of water is performed by adding benzene to form a tertiary azeotrope and distilling off the water. Smaller amounts of water are removed by drying with calcium oxide (CaO), potassium carbonate (K_{2}CO_{3}), calcium sulfate (CaSO_{4}), or magnesium sulfate (MgSO_{4}), followed by fractional distillation. Anhydrous tert-butyl alcohol is obtained by further refluxing and distilling from magnesium activated with iodine, or alkali metals such as sodium or potassium. Other methods include the use of 4 Å molecular sieves, aluminium tert-butylate, calcium hydride (CaH_{2}), or fractional crystallization under inert atmosphere.

== Applications ==
tert-Butyl alcohol is used as a solvent, ethanol denaturant, paint remover ingredient, and gasoline octane booster and oxygenate. It is a chemical intermediate used to produce methyl tert-butyl ether (MTBE) and ethyl tert-butyl ether (ETBE) by reaction with methanol and ethanol, respectively, and tert-butyl hydroperoxide (TBHP) by reaction with hydrogen peroxide.

== Reactions ==
Unlike other isomers of butanol, tert-butyl alcohol, as a tertiary alcohol, has no hydrogen atom next to hydroxy-group, which makes it resistant to oxidation to carbonyl compounds.

tert-Butyl alcohol is deprotonated with a strong base to give the alkoxide. Particularly common is potassium tert-butoxide, which is prepared by treating tert-butanol with potassium metal.

2 K + 2 (CH_{3})_{3}COH → 2 (CH_{3})_{3}CO^{−}K^{+} + H_{2}

The tert-butoxide is a strong, non-nucleophilic base in organic chemistry. It readily abstracts acidic protons from substrates, but its steric bulk inhibits the group from participating in nucleophilic substitution, such as in a Williamson ether synthesis or an S_{N}2 reaction.

tert-Butyl alcohol reacts with hydrogen chloride to form tert-butyl chloride.

O-Chlorination of tert-butyl alcohol with hypochlorous acid to give tert-butyl hypochlorite:

(CH_{3})_{3}COH + HOCl → (CH_{3})_{3}COCl + H_{2}O

== Pharmacology and toxicology ==
There is limited data on the pharmacology and toxicology of tert-butanol in humans and other animals. Human exposure may occur due to fuel oxygenate metabolism. tert-Butanol is poorly absorbed through skin but rapidly absorbed if inhaled or ingested. tert-Butanol is irritating to skin or eyes. Toxicity of single doses is usually low but high doses of tert-butyl alcohol can produce a sedative or anesthetic effect.
