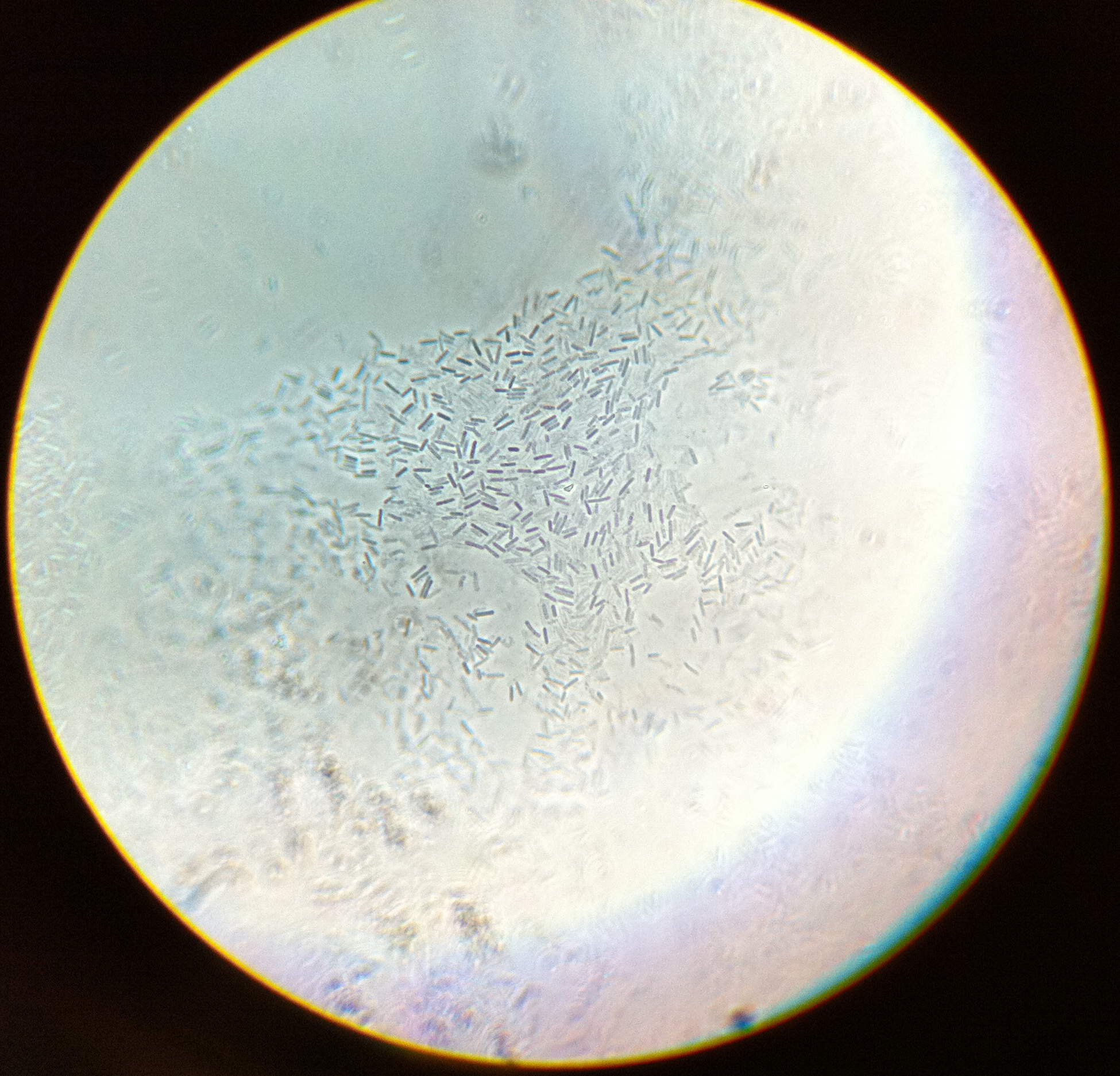

Scientific classification
- Domain: Bacteria
- Kingdom: Bacillati
- Phylum: Bacillota
- Class: Clostridia
- Order: Eubacteriales
- Family: Clostridiaceae
- Genus: Clostridium
- Species: C. acetobutylicum

Binomial name
- Clostridium acetobutylicum McCoy et al. 1926 (Approved Lists 1980)

= Clostridium acetobutylicum =

Species of bacterium

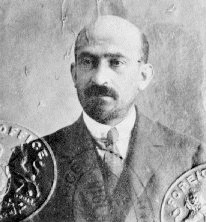
Chaim Weizmann

Clostridium acetobutylicum, ATCC 824, is a commercially valuable bacterium sometimes called the Weizmann organism, after Jewish Russian-born biochemist Chaim Weizmann. A senior lecturer at the University of Manchester, England, he used them in 1916 as a bio-chemical tool to produce at the same time, jointly, acetone, ethanol, and n-butanol from starch. The method has been described since as the ABE process (acetone-butanol-ethanol fermentation process), yielding 3 parts of acetone, 6 of n-butanol, and 1 of ethanol. Acetone was used in the important wartime task of casting cordite. The alcohols were used to produce vehicle fuels and synthetic rubber.

Unlike yeast, which can digest only some sugars into alcohol and carbon dioxide, C. acetobutylicum and other Clostridia can digest whey, sugars (pentoses, hexoses) and carbohydrates (oligosaccharides and polysaccharides, but not cellulose), starch and perhaps certain types of lignin, yielding n-butanol, propionic acid, ether, and glycerin.

== In genetic engineering ==
In 2008, a strain of Escherichia coli was genetically engineered to synthesize butanol; the genes were derived from Clostridium acetobutylicum. In 2013, the first microbial production of short-chain alkanes was reported - which is a considerable step toward the production of gasoline. One of the crucial enzymes - a fatty acyl-CoA reductase - came from Clostridium acetobutylicum.

== See also ==
- ABE
- Acetone
- Butanol
- Clostridium beijerinckii
- Ethanol
