= Biogasoline =

Gasoline produced from biomass

Biogasoline is a type of synthetic gasoline produced from biomass such as algae and plants. Like traditionally petroleum-derived gasoline, biogasoline is made up of hydrocarbons with 6 (hexane) to 12 (dodecane) carbon atoms per molecule, and can be directly used in conventional internal combustion engines. However, unlike traditional gasoline, which are fractionally distilled from crude oil and thus are non-renewable fossil fuels, biogasolines are renewable biofuels made from algal materials, energy crops such as beets and sugarcane, and other cellulosic residues traditionally regarded to as agricultural waste.

Biofuels most often apply to the product of compounded biomass substance called feedstocks. Biomass is abstract in nature and used to produce gasoline that generates net-zero carbon emissions through a process called gasification. There are multi-various methods through which this fuel can be produced; however, determining the optimal gasification route through which to apply a particular feedstock or biomass relies on experimentation and trial and error.

Biogasoline chemically differs from common biofuels such as biobutanol and bioethanol, as these substances are alcohols. Biogasoline is, however, chemically similar to biodiesel, which are made with additional carbons.

== Biofuels ==
There are two main types of biofuels produced: Ethanol and Biodiesel.

=== Diesel ===
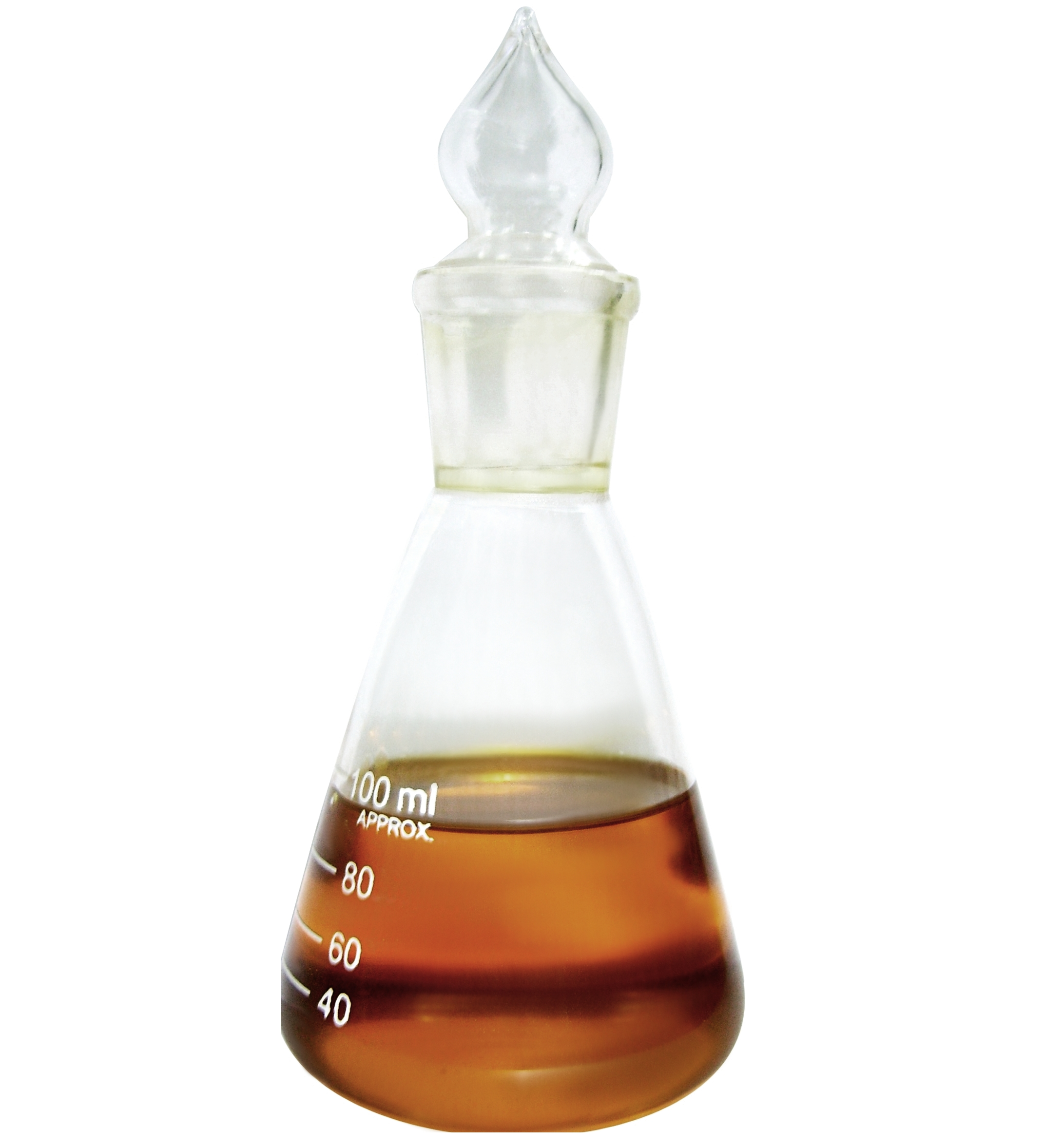
Biodiesel in liquid state

Biodiesel is a liquid fuel composed of vegetable oils and or animal fats. To create the gasoline itself, these subsequent liquids are combined with alcohol. Biodiesel is used to fuel compression ignition engines, otherwise known as diesel engines. The most common product of biodiesel is B20, a 20:80 blend: 20% biodiesel to 80% petroleum diesel. However, biodiesel is flexible in nature and can combine with petroleum diesel at varying levels. As of 2021, Biodiesel serves as the second largest asset of biofuel consumption and production-ranging 23% overall.

=== Ethanol ===
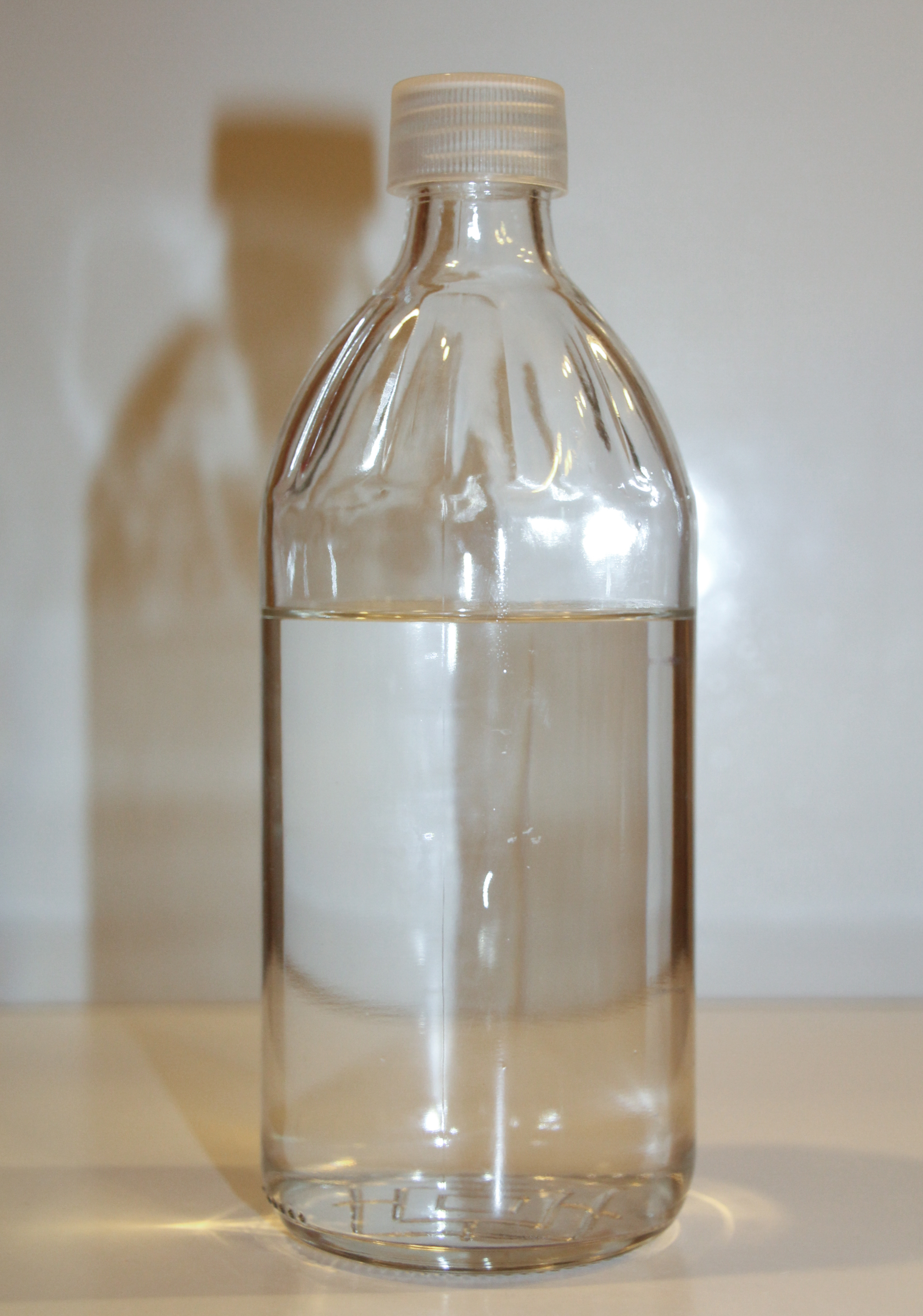
Absolute ethanol

Ethanol fuel is assembled from numerous plants and their respective biomasses and is mainly used as a mix-in alcohol. When these substances are combined, the pressure at which a fuel will combust, otherwise known as octane, increases. Ethanol works to combat the byproducts produced by many modern day vehicles-such as carbon monoxide, nitrogen oxides and volatile organic compounds. The majority of ethanol gasolines are E10 or E15; however some vehicles allow for differing configurations of ethanol.

Due to its composition and versatility, ethanol accounted for approximately 83% of biofuel consumption and production rates in the U.S. in 2021.

== Structure and properties ==
=== Biodiesel Structure ===
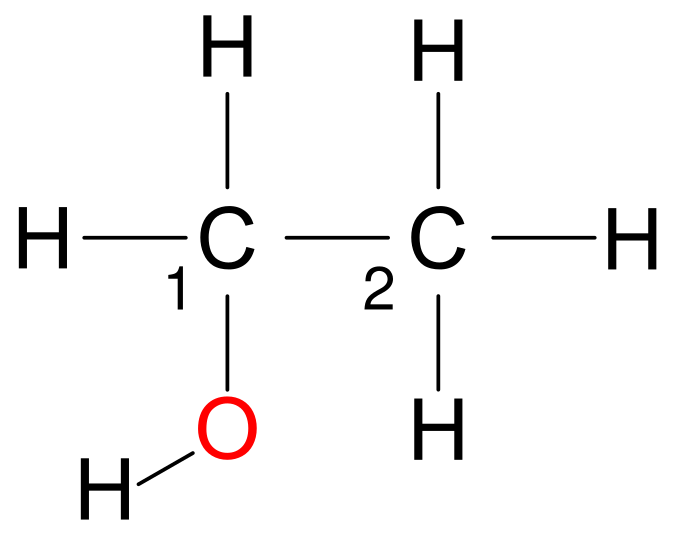
Ethanol's chemical composition

Similar to other gasoline structures, biodiesel is built from a foundation of hydrocarbons. BG100, or 100% biogasoline, is formulated so that it can immediately be used as a drop-in substitute for petroleum-derived gasoline in any conventional gasoline engine, unlike ethanol. Additionally, biogasoline's chemical similarities allow it to be fully miscible with regular gasoline and can be distributed in the same fueling infrastructure as its properties match traditional gasoline from petroleum. Biodiesel works within today's engines, car systems, and corresponding products and requires a small percentage of octane booster to match gasoline.

=== Ethanol Structure ===
In order to produce Ethanol, it is likely to engage in a process of fermentation. Most forms of ethanol found within the United States are corn starch or plant starch and sugars, which then need to be metabolized by microorganisms in order to produce ethanol. These microorganisms include varying bacteria and yeast. Ethanol fuel (E85) requires specialized fuel systems and has lower combustion energy and corresponding fuel economy.

== Comparison of biogasoline to other common fuels ==
Fuel	Energy Density MJ/L	Air-fuel ratio	Specific Energy MJ/kg	Heat of Vaporization MJ/kg	RON	MON
Gasoline	34.6	14.6	46.9	0.36	91–99	81–89
Butanol fuel	29.2	11.2	36.6	0.43	96	78
Ethanol fuel	24.0	9.0	30.0	0.92	129	102
Methanol fuel	19.7	6.5	15.6	1.2	136	104

== Production ==
=== Biogasoline Production ===
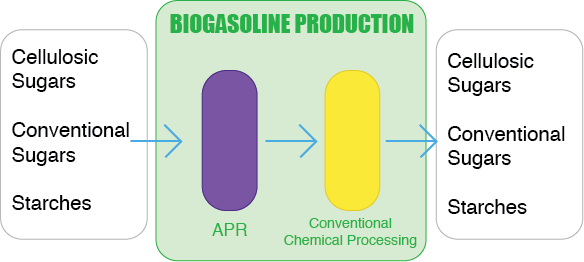
Biogasoline Production Process

In late March, 2010, the world's first biogasoline demonstration plant was started in Madison, WI by Virent Energy Systems, Inc. In 2001, Virent discovered and developed a technique called Aqueous Phase Reforming (APR). APR includes processes such as reforming to generate hydrogen, dehydrogenation of alcohols/hydrogenation of carbonyls, deoxygenation reactions, hydrogenolysis and cyclization.

The input for APR is a carbohydrate solution created from plant material, and the product is a mixture of chemicals and oxygenated hydrocarbons. From there, the materials go through further conventional chemical processing to yield the final result: a mixture of non-oxygenated hydrocarbons. These hydrocarbons are the exact hydrocarbons found in petroleum fuels, which is why today's cars do not need to be altered to run on biogasoline. The only difference is in origin.

=== Biodiesel Production ===
Diesel fuel is made up of linear hydrocarbons. These are long straight carbon atom chains which differ from the shorter, branched hydrocarbons that make up common gasoline.

In a 2014 experiment, held at the University of California, Davis, researchers used a feedstock of levulinic acid to create biogasoline. Levulinic acid is derived from cellulose material, such as corn stalks, straw or other plant waste and does not have to be fermented. The fuel-making process is reportedly inexpensive and offers yields of over 60 percent.

== Research ==
Research is conducted in both academic and private sectors.

=== Academic ===
Virginia Polytechnic Institute and State University has been researching the production of stable biogasoline in current oil refineries. Their focus surrounded bio-oil's shelf-life. The use of catalysts was applied in order to remove impurities from the processed plant sugars. The researchers extended the time from three months to over a year.

Iowa State University researchers use a type of fermentation in their practices. First, they form a gaseous mixture and then pyrolyze it. The result of the pyrolysis is bio-oil, of which the sugar-rich portion is fermented and distilled to create water and ethanol, while the high-acetate portion is separated into biogasoline, water, and biomass.

Princeton University researchers within José Avalos's lab presented new glowing biofuel in January 2022. This process presents a tool in yeast strain separation; instead of fermentation and curation of a few cultures over a 24 to 48 hour time period, thousands of yeast stains are being produced each minute.

=== Private ===
Virent Energy Systems, Inc., in conjunction with Marathon Petroleum, has developed a technique to turn plant sugars from wheat straw, corn stalks, and sugarcane pulp into biogasoline. The sugars are converted into hydrocarbons similar to those in regular gasoline by the use of catalysts.

== History of Biofuels ==
Consumption and Production of biofuels has played an essential role in the gasoline economy since the beginning of the 1980s. Most recently, companies and organizations, such as the federal Renewable Fuel Standard (RFS) Program and California's Low Carbon Fuel Storage have set initiatives to promote the use of biofuels and reduce fossil fuel-based gasoline. Moreover, in 2016, the Oregon Legislature enacted the Clean Fuels Program (CPF)-managed by the Department of Environmental Quality Commission-and Washington, their own program in January, 2023. Other locations known to have created their own clean fuel program include California and British Columbia.

== Economic viability and future ==
One of the major problems facing the economic viability of biogasoline is the high up-front cost. Another, tax relief: The government is providing tax relief for ethanol fuels but has yet to offer tax relief for biogasoline. If biogasoline became a serious alternative, a large percentage of existing arable land would be converted to grow crops solely for biogasoline. This could decrease the amount of land used to farm food for human consumption and may decrease overall feedstock.

While there may be problems facing the economic viability of biogasoline, the partnership between Royal Dutch Shell and Virent Energy Systems, Inc., a bioscience firm based in Madison, WI, to further research biogasoline is an encouraging sign for biogasoline's future. Companies are developing new approaches: taking triglyceride inputs and, through deoxygenation process and reforming (cracking, isomerizing, aromatizing, and producing cyclic molecules), producing biogasoline. This biogasoline is intended to match the chemical, kinetic, and combustion characteristics of its petroleum counterpart, but with much higher octane levels. Others are pursuing similar approaches based on hydrotreating or using woody biomass and enzymatic processes.

Moreover, nations are enacting policies that increase the use of biogasoline. This helps restrain the use of fossil fuels and create more energy independence. Current efforts by this partnership are focused on improving the technology and making it available for large-scale production.

== See also ==
- Algae fuel
- Bioplastic
- Butanol fuel
