= Butyl acrylate =

Names
- Preferred IUPAC name Butyl prop-2-enoate
- Other names: n-Butyl acrylate; Butyl ester of acrylic acid; Butyl-2-propenoate

Identifiers
CAS Number	141-32-2
3D model (JSmol)	Interactive image
ChEBI	CHEBI:3245
ChEMBL	ChEMBL1546388
ChemSpider	8514
ECHA InfoCard	100.004.983
EC Number	205-480-7
KEGG	C10921
PubChem CID	8846
RTECS number	UD3150000
UNII	705NM8U35V
UN number	2348
CompTox Dashboard (EPA)	DTXSID6024676
- InChI: InChI=1S/C7H12O2/c1-3-5-6-9-7(8)4-2/h4H, 2-3,5-6H2,1H3 Key: CQEYYJKEWSMYFG-UHFFFAOYSA-N; InChI=1/C7H12O2/c1-3-5-6-9-7(8)4-2/h4H, 2-3,5-6H2,1H3 Key: CQEYYJKEWSMYFG-UHFFFAOYAL
- SMILES: CCCCOC(=O)C=C

Properties
Chemical formula	C_{7}H_{12}O_{2}
Molar mass	128.171 g·mol^{−1}
Appearance	Colorless liquid
Odor	Strong, fruity
Density	0.89 g/mL (20°C)
Melting point	−64 °C; −83 °F; 209 K
Boiling point	145 °C; 293 °F; 418 K
Solubility in water	0.1% (20°C)
Solubility	organic solvents
Vapor pressure	4 mmHg (20°C)

Hazards
- GHS labelling
Pictograms	(GHS02: Flammable) (GHS07: Exclamation mark)
Signal word	Warning
Hazard statements	H226, H315, H317, H319, H335
Precautionary statements	P210, P233, P240, P241, P242, P243, P261, P264, P271, P272, P280, P302+P352, P303+P361+P353, P304+P340, P305+P351+P338, P312, P321, P332+P313, P333+P313, P337+P313, P362, P363, P370+P378, P403+P233, P403+P235, P405, P501
Flash point	39 °C; 103 °F; 313 K
Autoignition temperature	267 °C (513 °F; 540 K)
Explosive limits	1.5% - 9.9%
- Lethal dose or concentration (LD, LC)
LD_{50} (median dose)	1800 mg/kg (dermal, rabbit)
LC_{50} (median concentration)	1000 ppm (4 hr)
- NIOSH (US health exposure limits)
REL (Recommended)	TWA 10 ppm (55 mg/m^{3})
- Except where otherwise noted, data are given for materials in their standard state (at 25 °C [77 °F], 100 kPa). Infobox references

Butyl acrylate is an organic compound with the formula C_{4}H_{9}O_{2}CCH=CH_{2}. A colorless liquid, it is the butyl ester of acrylic acid. It is used commercially on a large scale as a precursor to poly(butyl acrylate). Especially as copolymers, such materials are used in paints, sealants, coatings, adhesives, fuel, textiles, plastics, and caulk.

== Production and properties ==
Butyl acrylate can be produced by the acid-catalyzed esterification of acrylic acid with butanol. It polymerizes easily, therefore commercial preparations contain polymerization inhibitors such as hydroquinone, phenothiazine, or hydroquinone ethyl ether.

== Safety ==
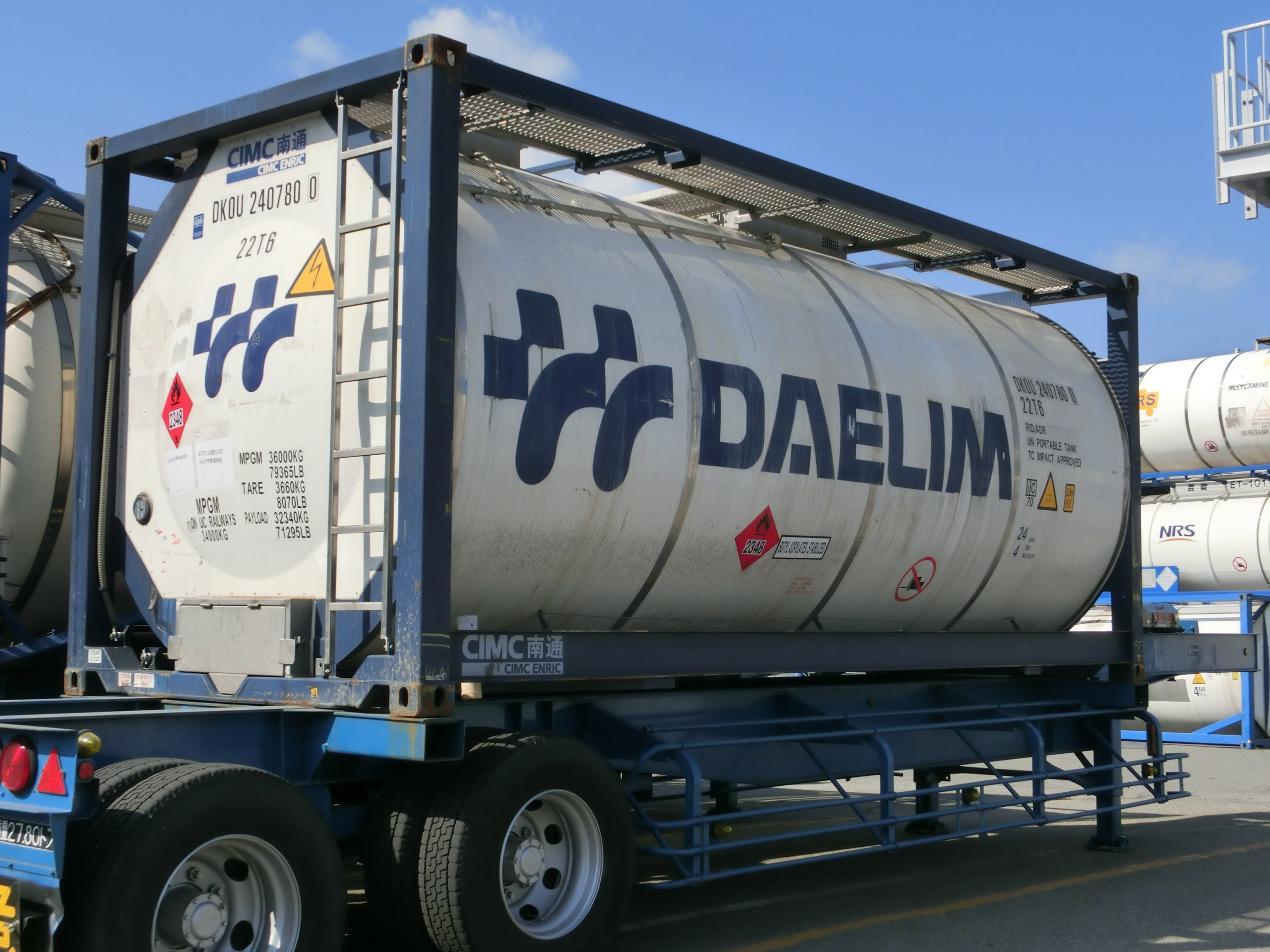
Shipping container for the substance, shown in Japan.

Butyl acrylate is of low acute toxicity with an LD_{50} (rat) of 3143 mg/kg.

In rodent models, butyl acrylate is metabolized by carboxylesterase or reactions with glutathione; this detoxification produces acrylic acid, butanol, and mercapturic acid waste, which are excreted.

Exposure can occur through inhalation, skin and/or eye contact absorption, and ingestion. Symptoms may be dependent on exposure route, with skin and eye contact manifesting in redness, pain, and sensitivity; inhalation resulting in burning sensations, cough, shortness of breath, and sore throat; and ingestion resulting in abdominal pain, nausea, vomiting, and diarrhoea.
