= Butyl acetates =

Butyl acetates (also acetic acid butyl esters) are organic chemical compounds and comprise a group of four saturated carboxylic acid esters exhibiting structural isomerism. They are the esters formed from acetic acid and the four isomeric butanols. They share the molecular formula C_{6}H_{12}O_{2} and have a molar mass of 116.16 g/mol. sec-Butyl acetate is also chiral and exists as two enantiomeric forms. Consequently, a total of five isomers are possible. Butyl acetates occur naturally, for example in fruits, and are widely used industrially as solvents and flavorings.

== Representatives and properties ==
Butyl acetates
Name	Acetic acid n-butyl ester	Acetic acid isobutyl ester	Acetic acid sec-butyl ester	Acetic acid tert-butyl ester
Other names	n-butyl acetate	isobutyl acetate	sec-butyl acetate (RS)-acetic acid sec-butyl ester	tert-butyl acetate
Structural formula			(chiral)	
CAS number	Q411073	Q420657	Q421143	Q285657
PubChem	CID 31272 from PubChem	CID 8038 from PubChem	CID 7758 from PubChem	CID 10908 from PubChem
State	liquid			
Melting point	-77 °C	-98.9 °C	-99 °C	
Boiling point	127 °C	118 °C	112 °C	97 °C

== Occurrence ==
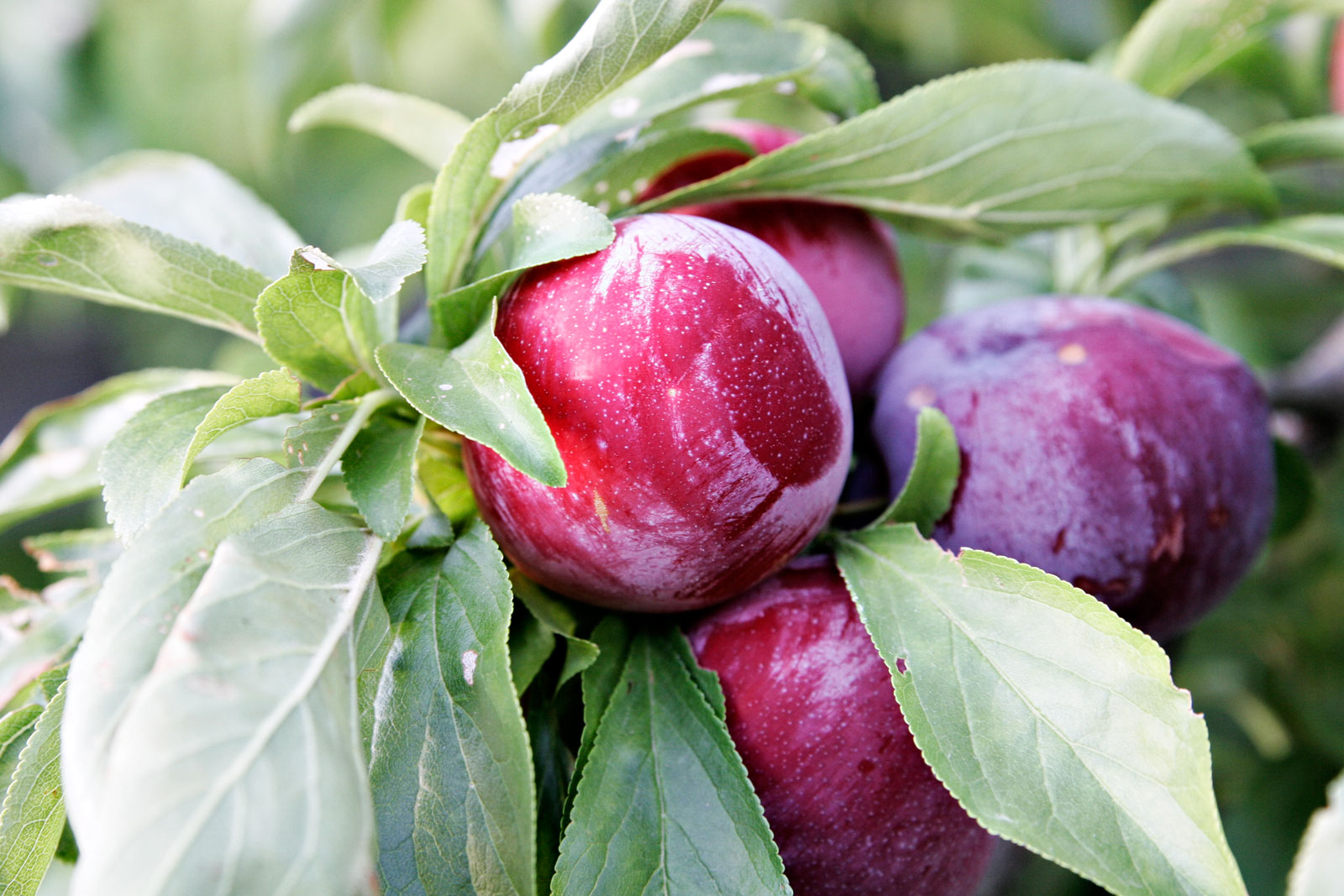
Plums are among the fruits in which both n-butyl acetate and isobutyl acetate occur

n-Butyl acetate and isobutyl acetate occur as flavor constituents in numerous fruits. In cultivated apple, pears, bananas, plum, melon, and papaya, for example, both compounds are present.

== Use ==
n-Butyl acetate and sec-butyl acetate are among the most important solvents used in coating processes, while isobutyl acetate is employed to a lesser extent in this field. n-Butyl acetate is one of the most important solvents for nail polish; isobutyl acetate is occasionally used for this purpose as well. Three butyl acetates are used as flavoring agents and are generally authorized for use in food within the European Union: n-butyl acetate is approved under FL number 09.004, isobutyl acetate under number 09.005, and sec-butyl acetate under number 09.323.
