= Butyl group =

Chemical group (–C4H9) derived from butane

In organic chemistry, butyl is a four-carbon alkyl radical or substituent group with general chemical formula −C_{4}H_{9}, derived from either of the two isomers (n-butane and isobutane) of butane.

The isomer n-butane can connect in two ways, giving rise to two "-butyl" groups:

- If it connects at one of the two terminal carbon atoms, it is normal butyl or n-butyl: −CH_{2}−CH_{2}−CH_{2}−CH_{3} (preferred IUPAC name: butyl)
- If it connects at one of the non-terminal (internal) carbon atoms, it is secondary butyl or sec-butyl: −CH(CH_{3})−CH_{2}−CH_{3} (preferred IUPAC name: butan-2-yl)

The second isomer of butane, isobutane, can also connect in two ways, giving rise to two additional groups:

- If it connects at one of the three terminal carbons, it is isobutyl: −CH_{2}−CH(CH_{3})_{2} (preferred IUPAC name: 2-methylpropyl)
- If it connects at the central carbon, it is tertiary butyl, tert-butyl or t-butyl: −C(CH_{3})_{3} (preferred IUPAC name: tert-butyl)

== Nomenclature ==
According to IUPAC nomenclature, "isobutyl", "sec-butyl", and "tert-butyl" used to be allowed retained names. The latest guidance changed that: only tert-butyl is kept as preferred prefix, all other butyl-names are removed. In the convention of skeletal formulas, every line ending and line intersection specifies a carbon atom (unless otherwise indicated) saturated with single-linked hydrogen atoms (unless otherwise indicated). The "R" symbol indicates any radical or other non-specific functional group.

| Skeletal formula of butyl (here connected to an R group) | Common name | Preferred IUPAC name | Alternate notation | Fully systematic name | Symbol |
|---|---|---|---|---|---|
| | n-butyl | butyl | butyl | butan-1-yl | Bu, n-Bu, nBu, ^{n}Bu |
| | sec-butyl | butan-2-yl | 1-methylpropyl | butan-2-yl | s-Bu, sBu, ^{s}Bu |
| | isobutyl, iso-butyl | 2-methylpropyl | 2-methylpropyl | 2-methylpropan-1-yl | i-Bu, iBu, ^{i}Bu |
| | tert-butyl | tert-butyl | 1,1-dimethylethyl | 2-methylpropan-2-yl | t-Bu, tBu, ^{t}Bu |

Butyl is the largest substituent for which trivial names are commonly used for all isomers.

The butyl group's carbon that is connected to the rest (R) of the molecule is called the R^{I} or R-prime carbon. The prefixes sec (from "secondary") and tert (from "tertiary") refer to the number of additional side chains (or carbons) connected to the first butyl carbon. The prefix "iso" or "iso" means "isolated" while the prefix 'n-' stands for "normal".

Butan-2-yl (sec-butyl) group is chiral. The carbon atom at position 2 is a stereocenter. It has four different groups attached: −H, −CH_{3}, −CH_{2}−CH_{3}, and −R (the R group is not equal to those three groups). The names of the two chiral groups are: (2S)-butan-2-yl and (2R)-butan-2-yl.

== Examples ==
The four isomers (ignoring stereoisomers) of "butyl acetate" demonstrate these four isomeric configurations. Here, the acetate radical appears in each of the positions where the "R" symbol is used in the chart above:

| n-butyl acetate | sec-butyl acetate | isobutyl acetate | tert-butyl acetate |

sec-Butyl acetate is chiral, and has one stereocenter, and two enantiomers. The names of enantiomers are:

- [(2S)-butan-2-yl] acetate, (+)-sec-Butyl acetate
- [(2R)-butan-2-yl] acetate, (−)-sec-Butyl acetate

Therefore, for butyl acetate, the total number of isomers is five, if stereoisomers are included.

== Etymology ==
Alkyl radicals are often considered as a series, a progression sequenced by the number of carbon atoms involved. In that progression, Butyl (containing 4 carbon atoms) is the fourth, and the last with preferred IUPAC name derived from its history. The word "butyl" is derived from butyric acid, a four-carbon carboxylic acid found in rancid butter. The name "butyric acid" comes from Latin butyrum, butter. Subsequent preferred IUPAC names for alkyl radicals in the series are simply named from the Greek number that indicates the number of carbon atoms in the group: pentyl, hexyl, heptyl, etc.

== tert-Butyl "effects" ==
tert-Butyl group is special because it is bulky and it lacks alpha-H atoms. One way to assess the bulkiness of tert-Butyl uses the concept of ligand cone angle.

Cone angles of common phosphine ligands
| Ligand | Angle (°) |
|---|---|
| PH_{3} | 87 |
| P(CH_{3})_{3} | 118 |
| P(CH_{2}CH_{3})_{3} | 132 |
| P(C_{6}H_{5})_{3} | 145 |
| P(cyclo-C_{6}H_{11})_{3} | 179 |
| P(t-Bu)_{3} | 182 |

The bulkiness of the tert-butyl substituent is used in chemistry for kinetic stabilization. The effect of the tert-butyl group on cyclization reactions is called the Thorpe–Ingold effect.

tert-Butyl effect

The tert-butyl effect is an example of steric hindrance.

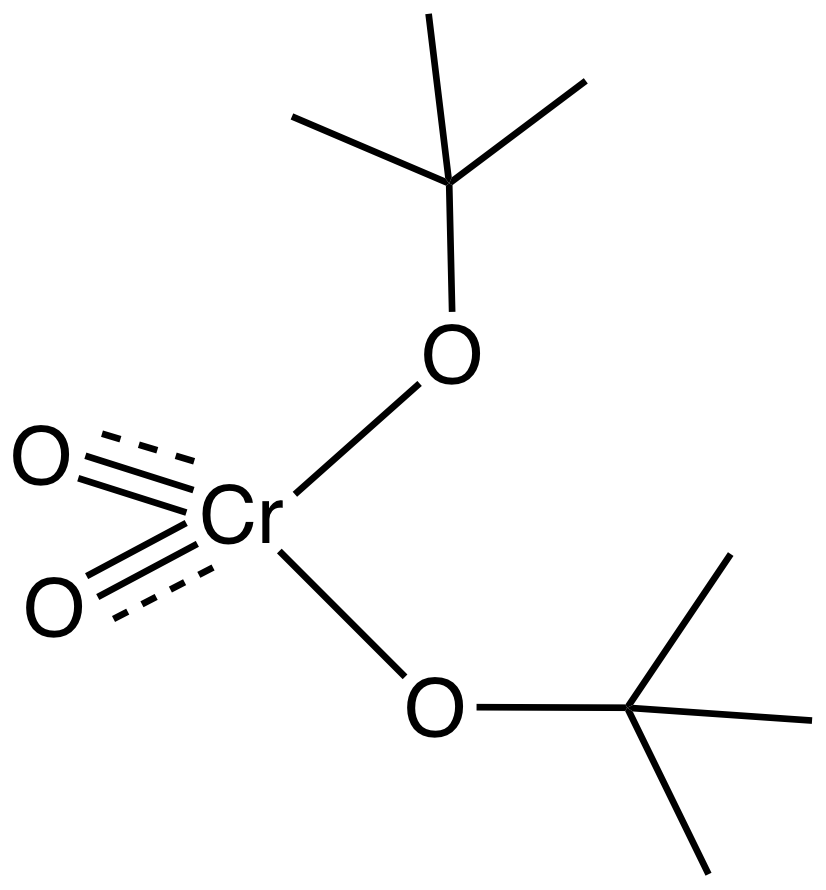
Di-tert-butyl chromate is a rare example of a stable chromate ester.

tert-Butyl groups lack alpha-hydrogen atoms. This aspect stabilizes di-tert-butyl chromate. Otherwise alpha-H's are abstracted by Cr(VI).

=== Protection and deprotection ===
A tert-butyl (tBu) ether is an acid-labile protecting group for alcohols.

A traditional way to introduce the tBu group to a hydroxyl group is by treating the compound with isobutylene in the presence of a Brønsted acid or Lewis acid.

Various acids can be used to cleave the tBu group, including both Brønsted acids such as trifluoroacetic acid and Lewis acids such as titanium tetrachloride.
