= Trimethylsilyl acetate =

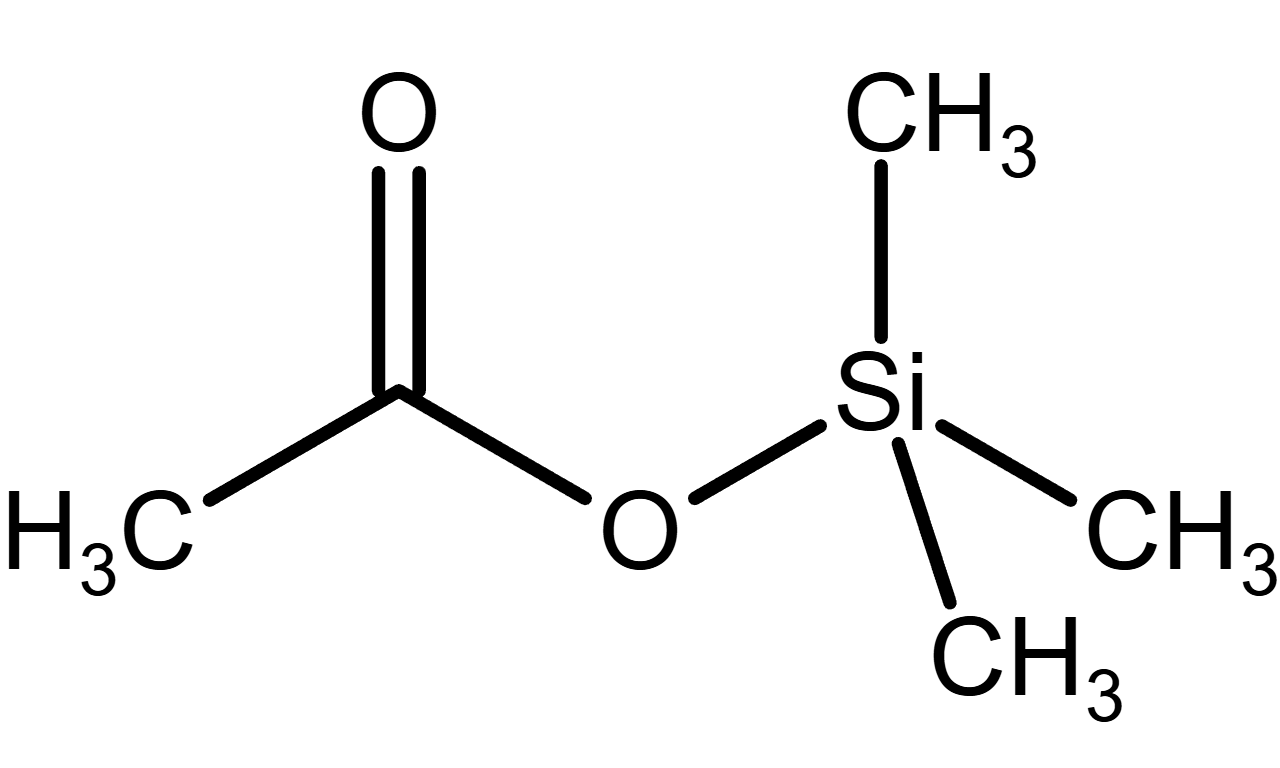

Names
- IUPAC name Trimethylsilyl acetate
- Other names: Acetic acid trimethylsilyl ester; Acetoxytrimethylsilane; TMSOAc; TMS acetate

Identifiers
CAS Number	2754-27-0
3D model (JSmol)	Interactive image
ChemSpider	68487
ECHA InfoCard	100.018.550
EC Number	220-404-2
PubChem CID	75988
UNII	LXX47M44WG
CompTox Dashboard (EPA)	DTXSID90883723
- InChI: InChI=1S/C5H12O2Si/c1-5(6)7-8(2,3)4/h1-4H3 Key: QHUNJMXHQHHWQP-UHFFFAOYSA-N
- SMILES: CC(=O)O[Si](C)(C)C

Properties
Chemical formula	CH_{3}COOSi(CH_{3})_{3}
Molar mass	132.234 g·mol^{−1}
Appearance	Colorless liquid
Odor	Mild, sweet
Density	0.882 g/cm^{3}, relative vapor density 4.57 (air = 1)
Melting point	−32 °C (−26 °F; 241 K)
Boiling point	107.5 °C (225.5 °F; 380.6 K)
Solubility in water	Soluble, reacts
Solubility	Soluble in diethyl ether and ethanol
Vapor pressure	47 hPa at 30 °C
Refractive index (n_{D})	1.388

Hazards
- Occupational safety and health (OHS/OSH)
Main hazards	Highly flammable
- GHS labelling
Pictograms	(GHS02: Flammable) (GHS07: Exclamation mark)
Signal word	Danger
Hazard statements	H225, H315, H319
Precautionary statements	P210, P233, P240, P241, P242, P243, P264, P280, P303+P361+P353, P370+P378, P403+P235, P501
Flash point	19 °C (66 °F; 292 K)

Related compounds
Related compounds	tert-Butyl acetate; Trimethylsilyl formate; Trimethyltin acetate
- Except where otherwise noted, data are given for materials in their standard state (at 25 °C [77 °F], 100 kPa). Infobox references

Trimethylsilyl acetate, also known as TMSOAc, is an organosilicon compound with the chemical formula CH_{3}COOSi(CH_{3})_{3}. It is a colorless liquid. It is the silyl ester analog of tert-butyl acetate, having a trimethylsilyl group −Si(CH_{3})_{3} in place of the tert-butyl group −C(CH_{3})_{3}.

== Synthesis ==
Trimethylsilyl acetate can be prepared by the reaction of trimethylsilyl chloride with sodium acetate in hexanes or diethyl ether in the presence of a phase-transfer catalyst to speed up the reaction.

(CH_{3})_{3}SiCl + CH_{3}COO^{−}Na^{+} → CH_{3}COOSi(CH_{3})_{3} + NaCl

== Applications and reactions ==
A trimethylsilyl acetate and methane mixture can be used to produce a-C:H:SiO_{x} coatings using plasma-enhanced chemical vapor deposition (PECVD), which have a hardness of up to 11 GPa.

Other coatings can be produced with a trimethylsilyl acetate and oxygen mixture, again using PECVD.

Trimethylsilyl acetate can also be used for acetylation of alcohols.
