= Trimethyltin acetate =

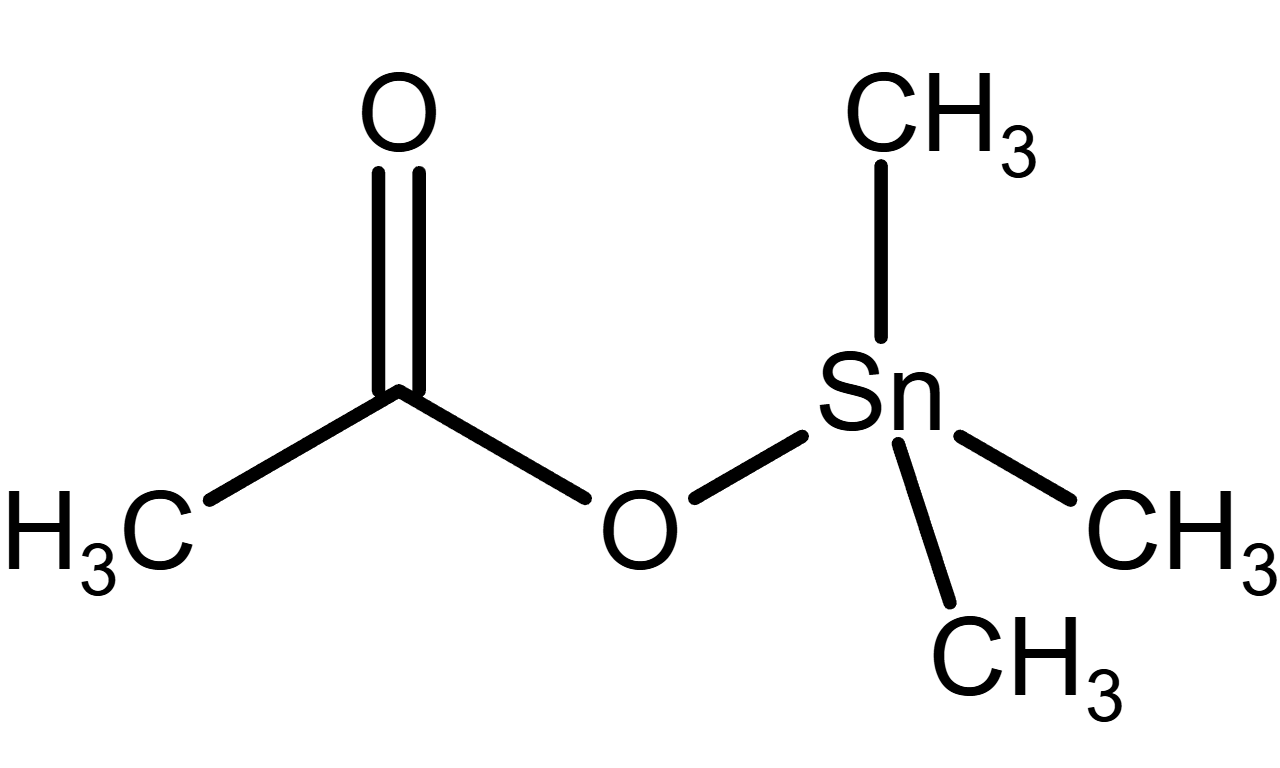

Names
- IUPAC name Trimethylstannyl acetate
- Other names: Acetic acid trimethylstannyl ester; Acetoxytrimethyltin; Trimethyltin acetate

Identifiers
CAS Number	1118-14-5
3D model (JSmol)	Interactive image
ChemSpider	21270003
ECHA InfoCard	100.289.298
PubChem CID	16683364
UNII	XI72N8D9SX
CompTox Dashboard (EPA)	DTXSID10149737
- InChI: InChI=1S/C2H4O2.3CH3.Sn/c1-2(3)4;;;;/h1H3,(H,3,4);3*1H3;/q;;;;+1/p-1 Key: XZVPFLCTEMAYFI-UHFFFAOYSA-M
- SMILES: CC(=O)O[Sn](C)(C)C

Properties
Chemical formula	CH_{3}COOSn(CH_{3})_{3}
Molar mass	222.859 g·mol^{−1}
Appearance	White crystalline solid
Melting point	193 °C (379 °F; 466 K)
Solubility	Sparingly soluble in chloroform and carbon tetrachloride.

Hazards
- Occupational safety and health (OHS/OSH)
Main hazards	Highly toxic
- GHS labelling
Pictograms	(GHS06: Toxic)
Signal word	Danger
- Lethal dose or concentration (LD, LC)
LD_{50} (median dose)	9 mg/kg (rat, oral)

Related compounds
Related compounds	tert-Butyl acetate; Trimethylsilyl acetate
- Except where otherwise noted, data are given for materials in their standard state (at 25 °C [77 °F], 100 kPa). Infobox references

Trimethyltin acetate is an organotin compound with the chemical formula CH_{3}COOSn(CH_{3})_{3}. It is a white crystalline solid. It is a poison.

== Preparation ==
Trimethyltin acetate can be prepared by reaction between tetramethyltin and mercury(I) acetate in methanol at room temperature.

2 (CH_{3})_{4}Sn + (CH_{3}COO)_{2}Hg_{2} → 2 CH_{3}COOSn(CH_{3})_{3} + (CH_{3})_{2}Hg + Hg

The previously known insoluble trimethyltin acetate has been converted to a new, soluble form by heating in a sealed tube with cyclohexane at 100 °C. The effects of temperature, concentration, and added complexing agents on the infrared and NMR spectra are reported. The results show an equilibrium in solution between monomeric and polymeric forms. It is suggested that the polymeric forms may have a cyclic structure, in contrast to the infinite linear polymeric structure attributed to the insoluble form.

== Uses ==
Trimethyltin acetate shows low antifungal activity.

== Safety ==
Triorganyltin compounds, like trimethyltin acetate, are poisonous. They are highly toxic if swallowed and harmful in contact with skin. Cause serious skin and eye irritation. They can cause serious eye damage. Cause serious damages to organs and nerves. They are highly toxic to aquatic life, with long-lasting effects.
