= Trimethylsilyl formate =

Names
- IUPAC name Trimethylsilyl formate
- Other names: Formic acid trimethylsilyl ester; TMS formate

Identifiers
CAS Number	18243-21-5
3D model (JSmol)	Interactive image
ChemSpider	453173
PubChem CID	519533
CompTox Dashboard (EPA)	DTXSID401347568
- InChI: InChI=1S/C4H10O2Si/c1-7(2,3)6-4-5/h4H,1-3H3 Key: KBPSATXXRVXAAJ-UHFFFAOYSA-N
- SMILES: C[Si](C)(C)OC=O

Properties
Chemical formula	C_{4}H_{10}O_{2}Si
Molar mass	118.207 g·mol^{−1}

Related compounds
Related compounds	tert-Butyl formate; Trimethylsilyl acetate
- Except where otherwise noted, data are given for materials in their standard state (at 25 °C [77 °F], 100 kPa). Infobox references

Trimethylsilyl formate (TMS formate) is an ester of formic acid, structurally analogous to tert-butyl formate but instead bearing a trimethylsilyl group (TMS). It is useful for hydrosilylation of a range of different ketones, giving the silyl ether in good yields. For this type of reaction, its ease of handling provides a practical advantage over the more traditional trimethylsilane reagent. It can also be used for silyl transfer reactions to convert alcohols to trimethylsilyl ethers. In this context, its practival advantage over other TMS donor reagents is that the reaction has only gaseous byproducts.
