= Propyl acetate =

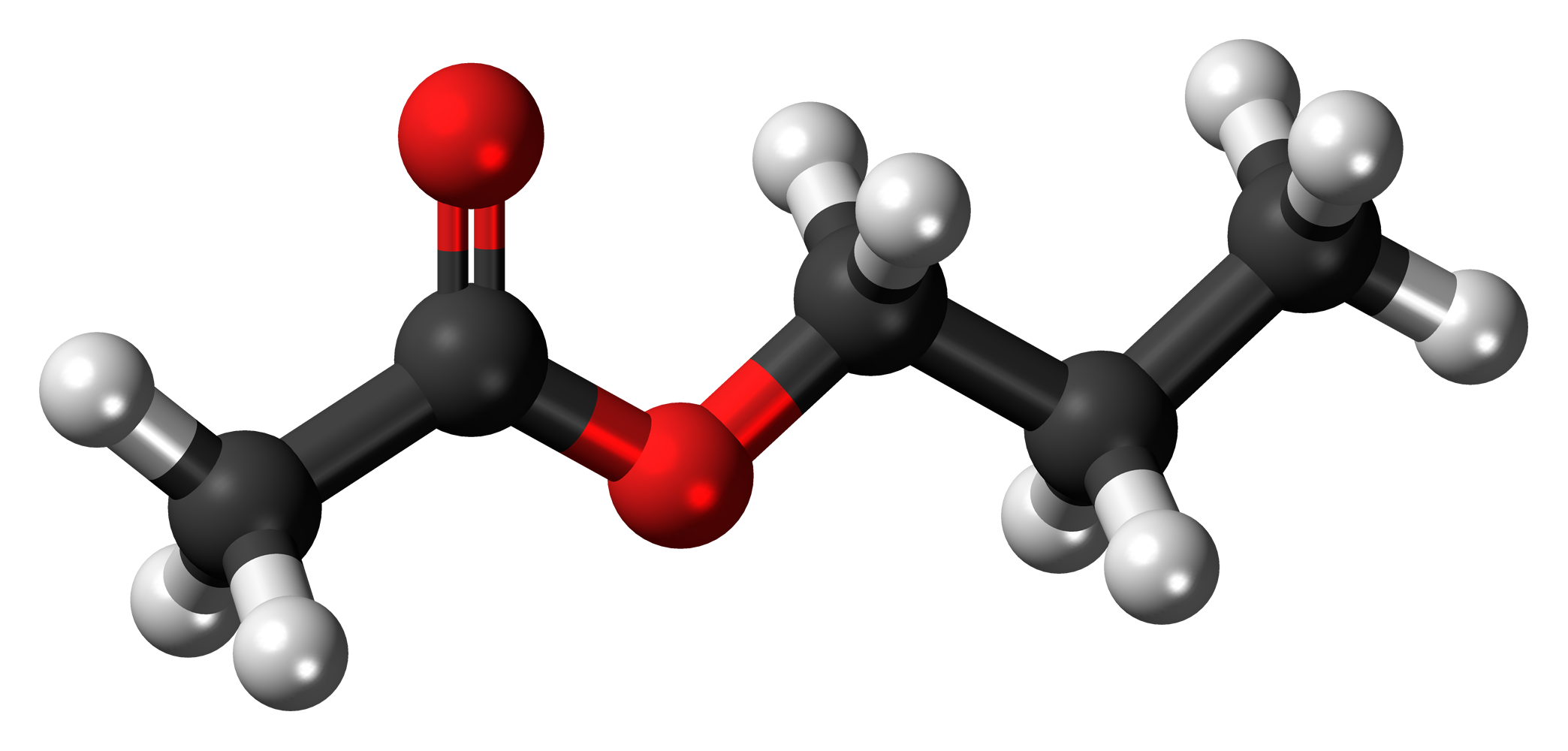

Names
- Preferred IUPAC name Propyl acetate
- Systematic IUPAC name Propyl ethanoate
- Other names Acetic acid propyl ester n-Propyl ethanoate n-Propyl acetate n-Propyl ester of acetic acid

Identifiers
CAS Number	109-60-4
3D model (JSmol)	Interactive image
ChEBI	CHEBI:40116
ChEMBL	ChEMBL44857
ChemSpider	7706
DrugBank	DB01670
ECHA InfoCard	100.003.352
EC Number	203-686-1
PubChem CID	7997
RTECS number	AJ3675000
UNII	4AWM8C91G6
UN number	1276
CompTox Dashboard (EPA)	DTXSID6021901
- InChI: InChI=1S/C5H10O2/c1-3-4-7-5(2)6/h3-4H2,1-2H3 Key: YKYONYBAUNKHLG-UHFFFAOYSA-N; InChI=1/C5H10O2/c1-3-4-7-5(2)6/h3-4H2,1-2H3 Key: YKYONYBAUNKHLG-UHFFFAOYAC
- SMILES: O=C(OCCC)C

Properties
Chemical formula	C_{5}H_{10}O_{2}
Molar mass	102.133 g·mol^{−1}
Appearance	Colorless liquid
Odor	Mild, fruity
Density	0.89 g/cm^{3}
Melting point	−95 °C (−139 °F; 178 K)
Boiling point	102 °C (216 °F; 375 K)
Solubility in water	18.9 g/L
Vapor pressure	25 mmHg (20 °C)
Magnetic susceptibility (χ)	−65.91·10^{−6} cm^{3}/mol

Hazards
- GHS labelling
Pictograms	(GHS02: Flammable) (GHS07: Exclamation mark)
Signal word	Danger
Hazard statements	H225, H319, H336
Precautionary statements	P210, P233, P240, P241, P242, P243, P261, P264, P271, P280, P303+P361+P353, P304+P340, P305+P351+P338, P312, P337+P313, P370+P378, P403+P233, P403+P235, P405, P501
NFPA 704 (fire diamond)	2 3 2
Flash point	10 °C (50 °F; 283 K)
Autoignition temperature	450 °C (842 °F; 723 K)
Explosive limits	1.7–8%
- Lethal dose or concentration (LD, LC)
LD_{50} (median dose)	9370 mg/kg (oral, rat); 8300 mg/kg (oral, mouse); 6640 mg/kg (oral, rabbit); 8700 mg/kg (oral, rat); 17800 mg/kg (dermal, rabbit)
LC_{Lo} (lowest published)	8941 ppm (cat, 5 hr)
- NIOSH (US health exposure limits)
PEL (Permissible)	TWA 200 ppm (840 mg/m^{3})
REL (Recommended)	TWA 200 ppm (840 mg/m^{3}) ST 250 ppm (1050 mg/m^{3})
IDLH (Immediate danger)	1700 ppm

Related compounds
Related esters	Ethyl acetate Isopropyl acetate n-butyl acetate Isobutyl acetate
Related compounds	Propan-1-ol; Acetic acid
- Except where otherwise noted, data are given for materials in their standard state (at 25 °C [77 °F], 100 kPa). verify (what is ?) Infobox references

Propyl acetate, also known as propyl ethanoate, is an organic compound. Nearly 20,000 tons are produced annually for use as a solvent. This colorless liquid is known by its characteristic odor of pears and some apples. Due to this fact, it is commonly used in fragrances and as a flavor additive. It is formed by the esterification of acetic acid and propan-1-ol, often via Fischer–Speier esterification, with sulfuric acid as a catalyst and water produced as a byproduct.
