= Ethyl acetate =

Organic compound (CH3CO2CH2CH3)

- Skeletal formula

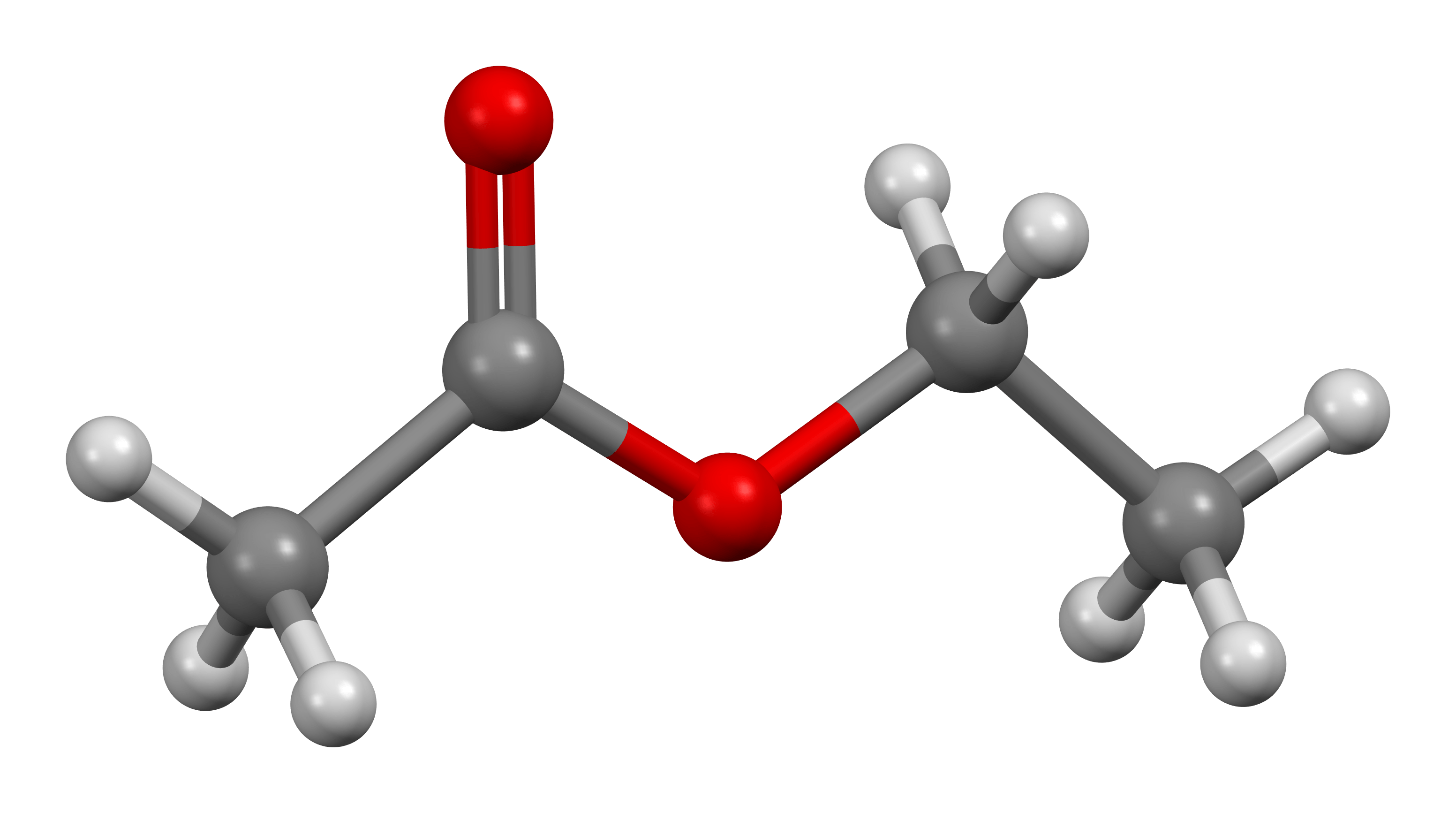
- Ball-and-stick model

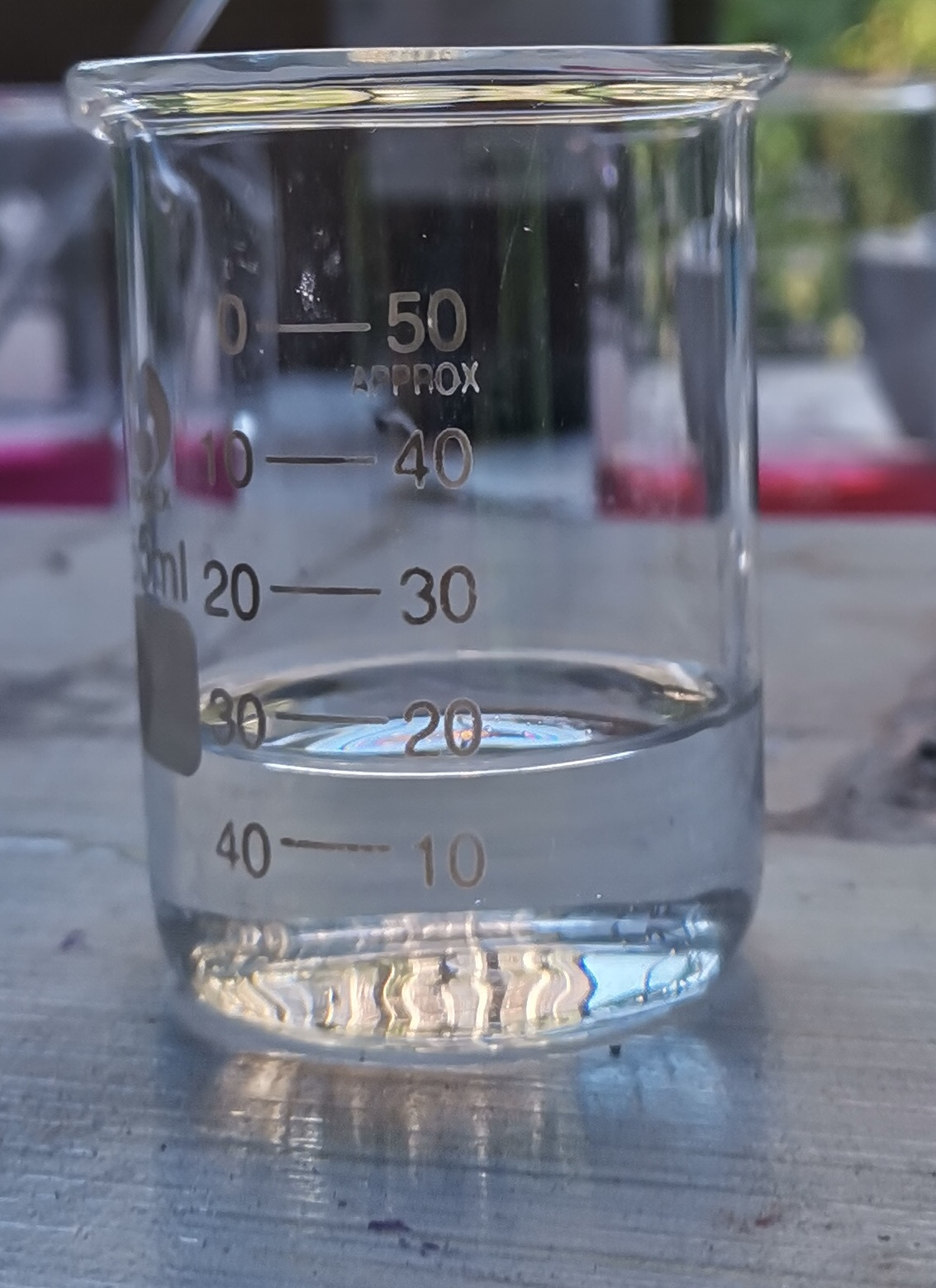

Names
- Preferred IUPAC name Ethyl acetate
- Systematic IUPAC name Ethyl ethanoate
- Other names: Acetic ester; Acetic ether; Ethyl ester of acetic acid; Ethanoic ethyl ester

Identifiers
CAS Number	141-78-6
3D model (JSmol)	Interactive image
Beilstein Reference	506104
ChEBI	CHEBI:27750
ChEMBL	ChEMBL14152
ChemSpider	8525
ECHA InfoCard	100.005.001
E number	E1504 (additional chemicals)
Gmelin Reference	26306
KEGG	D02319
PubChem CID	8857
RTECS number	AH5425000
UNII	76845O8NMZ
CompTox Dashboard (EPA)	DTXSID1022001
- InChI: InChI=1S/C4H8O2/c1-3-6-4(2)5/h3H2,1-2H3 Key: XEKOWRVHYACXOJ-UHFFFAOYSA-N; InChI=1/C3H8O2/c1-3-6-4(2)5/h3H2,1-2H3 Key: XEKOWRVHYACXOJ-UHFFFAOYAD
- SMILES: O=C(OCC)C

Properties
Chemical formula	C_{4}H_{8}O_{2}
Molar mass	88.106 g·mol^{−1}
Appearance	Colorless liquid
Odor	nail polish-like, fruity
Density	0.902 g/cm^{3}
Melting point	−83.6 °C (−118.5 °F; 189.6 K)
Boiling point	77.1 °C (170.8 °F; 350.2 K)
Solubility in water	8.3 g/100 mL (at 20 °C)
Solubility in ethanol, acetone, diethyl ether, benzene	Miscible
log P	0.71
Vapor pressure	73 mmHg (9.7 kPa) at 20 °C
Acidity (pK_{a})	25
Magnetic susceptibility (χ)	−54.10×10^{−6} cm^{3}/mol
Refractive index (n_{D})	1.3720
Viscosity	426 μPa·s (0.426 cP) at 25 °C

Structure
Dipole moment	1.78 D

Hazards
- Occupational safety and health (OHS/OSH)
Main hazards	Flammable (F), Irritant (Xi)
- GHS labelling
Pictograms	(GHS02: Flammable) (GHS07: Exclamation mark)
Signal word	Danger
Hazard statements	H225, H319, H336
Precautionary statements	P210, P233, P240, P305+P351+P338, P403+P235
NFPA 704 (fire diamond)	2 3 0
Flash point	−4 °C (25 °F; 269 K)
Explosive limits	2.0–11.5%
- Lethal dose or concentration (LD, LC)
LD_{50} (median dose)	11.3 g/kg, rat
LC_{50} (median concentration)	16,000 ppm (rat, 6 h); 12,295 ppm (mouse, 2 h); 1600 ppm (rat, 8 h)
LC_{Lo} (lowest published)	21 ppm (guinea pig, 1 h); 12,330 ppm (mouse, 3 h)
- NIOSH (US health exposure limits)
PEL (Permissible)	TWA 400 ppm (1400 mg/m^{3})
REL (Recommended)	TWA 400 ppm (1400 mg/m^{3})
IDLH (Immediate danger)	2000 ppm

Related compounds
Related carboxylate esters	Methyl acetate, Propyl acetate, Butyl acetate
Related compounds	Acetic acid, Ethanol, Diethyl ether

Supplementary data page
- Ethyl acetate (data page)
- Except where otherwise noted, data are given for materials in their standard state (at 25 °C [77 °F], 100 kPa). verify (what is ?) Infobox references

Ethyl acetate (commonly abbreviated EtOAc or EA) is the organic compound with the formula CH_{3}CO_{2}CH_{2}CH_{3}, simplified to C_{4}H_{8}O_{2}. This flammable, colorless liquid has a characteristic sweet smell (similar to pear drops) and is used in glues, nail polish removers, and the decaffeination process of tea and coffee. Ethyl acetate is the ester of ethanol and acetic acid; it is manufactured on a large scale for use as a solvent.

== Production and synthesis ==
Ethyl acetate was first synthesized by the Count de Lauraguais in 1759 by distilling a mixture of ethanol and acetic acid.

In 2004, an estimated 1.3 million tonnes were produced worldwide. The combined annual production in 1985 of Japan, North America, and Europe was about 400,000 tonnes. The global ethyl acetate market was valued at $3.3 billion in 2018.

Ethyl acetate is produced in industry mainly via the classic Fischer esterification reaction of ethanol and acetic acid. This mixture converts to the ester in about 65% yield at room temperature:

CH_{3}CO_{2}H + CH_{3}CH_{2}OH → CH_{3}CO_{2}CH_{2}CH_{3} + H_{2}O

The reaction can be accelerated by acid catalysts and the equilibrium can be shifted to the right by removal of water.

It is also prepared in industry using the Tishchenko reaction, by combining two equivalents of acetaldehyde in the presence of an alkoxide catalyst:

2 CH_{3}CHO → CH_{3}CO_{2}CH_{2}CH_{3}

It is also manufactured by the alkylation of acetic acid with ethylene, using silicotungstic acid as a catalyst:

C_{2}H_{4} + CH_{3}CO_{2}H → CH_{3}CO_{2}C_{2}H_{5}

== Uses ==
Ethyl acetate is used primarily as a solvent and diluent, being favored because of its low cost, low toxicity, and agreeable odor. For example, it is commonly used to clean circuit boards and in some nail varnish removers (acetone is also used). Coffee beans and tea leaves are decaffeinated with this solvent. It is also used in paints as an activator or hardener. Ethyl acetate is present in confectionery, perfumes, and fruits and imparts a brief ethereal, fruity, sweet aroma. In perfumes it evaporates quickly, leaving the scent of the perfume on the skin.

Ethyl acetate is an asphyxiant for use in insect collecting and study. In a killing jar charged with ethyl acetate, the vapors will kill the collected insect quickly without destroying it. Because it is not hygroscopic, ethyl acetate also keeps the insect soft enough to allow proper mounting suitable for a collection. However, ethyl acetate is regarded as potentially doing damage to insect DNA, making specimens processed this way less than ideal for subsequent DNA sequencing.

=== Laboratory uses ===
In the laboratory, mixtures containing ethyl acetate are commonly used in column chromatography and extractions. Ethyl acetate is rarely selected as a reaction solvent because it is prone to hydrolysis, transesterification, and condensations.

=== Occurrence in wines ===
Ethyl acetate is the most common ester in wine, being the product of the most common volatile organic acid – acetic acid, and the ethyl alcohol generated during the fermentation. The aroma of ethyl acetate is most vivid in younger wines and contributes towards the general perception of "fruitiness" in the wine. Sensitivity varies, with most people having a perception threshold around 120 mg/L. Excessive amounts of ethyl acetate are considered a wine fault.

== Reactions ==
Ethyl acetate is only weakly Lewis basic, like a typical carboxylic acid ester.

Ethyl acetate hydrolyses to give acetic acid and ethanol. Bases accelerate the hydrolysis, which is subject to the Fischer equilibrium mentioned above. In the laboratory, and usually for illustrative purposes only, ethyl esters are typically hydrolyzed in a two-step process starting with a stoichiometric amount of a strong base, such as sodium hydroxide. This reaction gives ethanol and sodium acetate, which is unreactive toward ethanol:

CH_{3}CO_{2}C_{2}H_{5} + NaOH → C_{2}H_{5}OH + CH_{3}CO_{2}Na

In the Claisen condensation, anhydrous ethyl acetate and strong bases react to give ethyl acetoacetate:

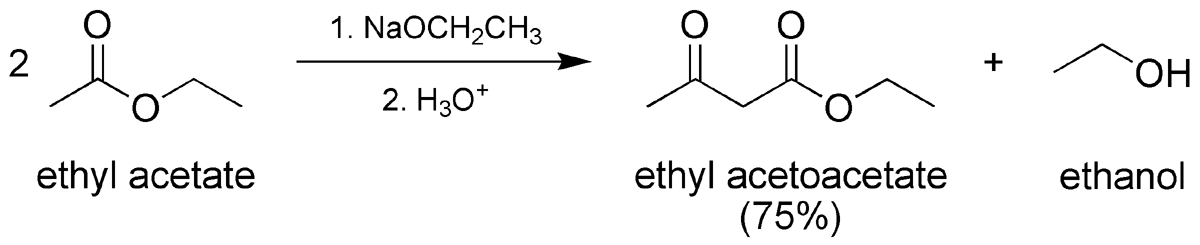
Preparation of ethyl acetoacetate.

== Properties ==
=== Physical properties ===
Vapor pressure of ethyl acetate

Heat of evaporation of ethyl acetate

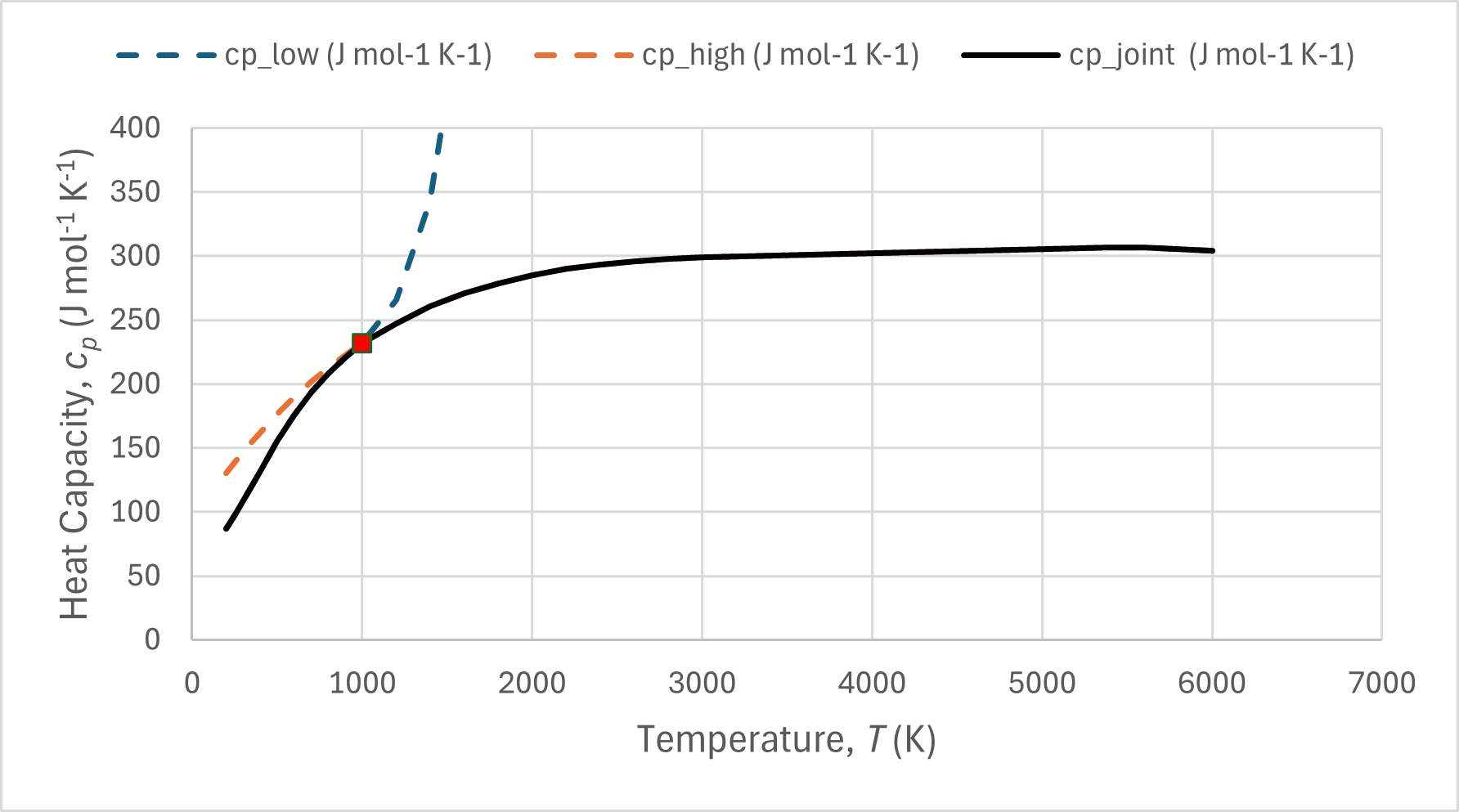
Heat capacity of ethyl acetate from the NASA seven-parameter polynomials tabulated in the Burcat database, entry in April 2008.

Its melting point is −83 °C, with a melting enthalpy of 10.48 kJ/mol. At atmospheric pressure, the compound boils at 77 °C. The vaporization enthalpy at the boiling point is 31.94 kJ/mol. The vapor pressure function follows the Antoine equation

$$\log_{10}(p) = A - \frac{B}{T + C},$$

where

$p$ is the vapor pressure in bars,
$T$ is the absolute temperature in kelvins, and
$A = 4.22809$, $B = 1245.702$, $C = -55.189$ are constants.

This function is valid within the temperature range of 289 to 349 K (16–76 °C).

The enthalpy of vaporization in kJ/mol is calculated according to the empirical equation by Majer and Svoboda

$$\Delta H_\text{vap} = A\exp(-\beta\,T_\text{r})\,(1 - T_\text{r})^\beta,$$

where

$T_\text{r} = T/T_\text{c}$ is the reduced temperature, and $T_\text{c}$ = 523.2 K is the critical temperature.
$A$ = 54.26 kJ/mol and $\beta$ = 0.2982 are constants.

The following table summarizes the most important thermodynamic properties of ethyl acetate under various conditions.

Compilation of key thermodynamic properties
Property	Type	Value	Remarks	References
Standard enthalpy of formation	$\Delta_f H^0_\text{liquid}$ $\Delta_f H^0_\text{gas}$	−480.57 kJ/mol −445.43 kJ/mol	as liquid as gas	
Standard entropy	$S^0_\text{liquid}$ $S^0_\text{gas}$	259.4 J/(mol·K); 362.75 J/(mol·K)	as liquid as gas	
Combustion enthalpy	$\Delta_c H^0_\text{liquid}$	−2235.4 kJ/mol		
Heat capacity (25 °C)	$c_p$	168.94 J/(mol·K); 1.92 J/(g·K); 113.64 J/(mol·K); 1.29 J/(g·K)	as liquid as gas	
Critical temperature	$T_\text{c}$	523.2 K		
Critical pressure	$p_\text{c}$	38.82 bar		
Critical density	$\rho_\text{c}$	3.497 mol/L		
Acentric factor	$\omega_c$	0.36641		

== Safety ==
The LD_{50} for rats is 5620 mg/kg, indicating low acute toxicity. Given that the chemical is naturally present in many organisms, there is little risk of toxicity.

World Health Organization (WHO) has assessed the Acceptable Daily Intake (ADI) of ethyl acetate at 25 mg per kg of body weight. This is similar to the ADI of other artificial sweeteners that are friendly and have been commonly used for a long time. According to European Food Safety Authority (EFSA), ethyl acetate taken orally is rapidly metabolized and broken down. The half-life in blood after ingestion exposure is known to be approximately 35 seconds.

Overexposure to ethyl acetate may cause irritation of the eyes, nose, and throat. Severe overexposure may cause weakness, drowsiness, and unconsciousness. Humans exposed to a concentration of 400 ppm in 1.4 mg/L ethyl acetate for a short time were affected by nose and throat irritation. Ethyl acetate is an irritant of the conjunctiva and mucous membrane of the respiratory tract. Animal experiments have shown that, at very high concentrations, the ester has central nervous system depressant and lethal effects; at concentrations of 20,000 to 43,000 ppm (2.0–4.3%), there may be pulmonary edema with hemorrhages, symptoms of central nervous system depression, secondary anemia and liver damage. In humans, concentrations of 400 ppm cause irritation of the nose and pharynx; cases have also been known of irritation of the conjunctiva with temporary opacity of the cornea. In rare cases exposure may cause sensitization of the mucous membrane and eruptions of the skin. The irritant effect of ethyl acetate is weaker than that of propyl acetate or butyl acetate.
