= Immediately dangerous to life or health =

Exposure to dangerous levels of airborne contaminants

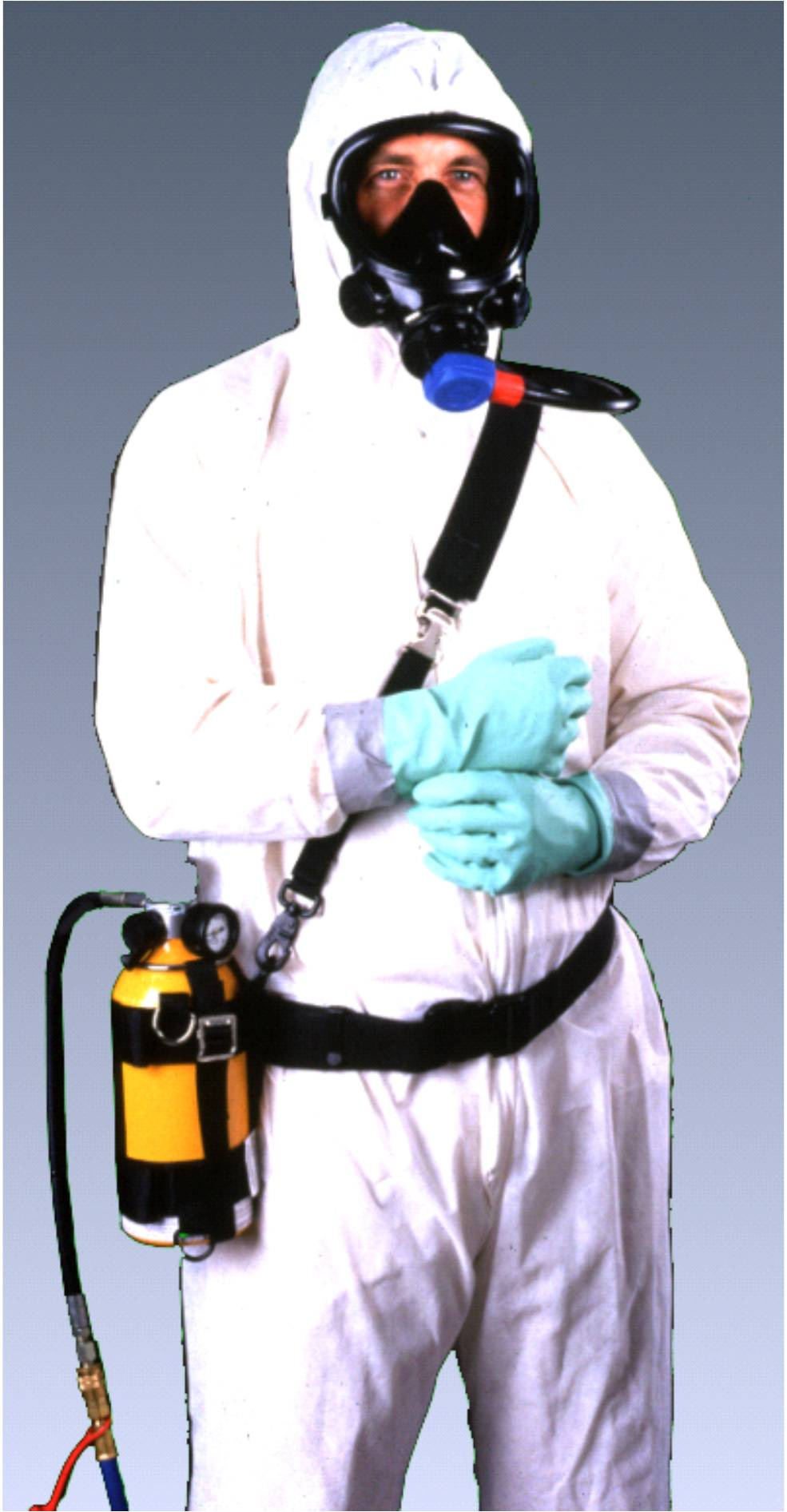
Personal protective equipment for IDLH conditions: pressure-demand supplied-air respirator equipped with a full facepiece in combination with an auxiliary pressure-demand self-contained breathing apparatus

The term "immediately dangerous to life or health" (IDLH) is defined by the US National Institute for Occupational Safety and Health (NIOSH) as exposure to airborne contaminants that is "likely to cause death or immediate or delayed permanent adverse health effects or prevent escape from such an environment." Examples include smoke or other poisonous gases at sufficiently high concentrations. It is calculated using the LD50 or LC50. The Occupational Safety and Health Administration (OSHA) regulation (1910.134(b)) defines the term as "an atmosphere that poses an immediate threat to life, would cause irreversible adverse health effects, or would impair an individual's ability to escape from a dangerous atmosphere."

IDLH values are often used to guide the selection of breathing apparatus that are made available to workers or firefighters in specific situations.

The NIOSH definition of IDLH does not include oxygen deficiency (below 19.5%), although an atmosphere-supplying breathing apparatus is required for work conducted in such an environment. Examples include high altitudes and unventilated, confined spaces.

The OSHA definition is arguably broad enough to include oxygen-deficient circumstances in the absence of "airborne contaminants", as well as many other chemical, thermal, or pneumatic hazards to life or health (e.g., pure helium, super-cooled or super-heated air, hyperbaric or hypo-baric or submerged chambers, etc.). It also uses the broader term "impair", rather than "prevent", with respect to the ability to escape. For example, blinding but non-toxic smoke could be considered IDLH under the OSHA definition if it would impair the ability to escape a "dangerous" but not life-threatening atmosphere (such as tear gas).

The OSHA definition is part of a legal standard, which is the minimum legal requirement. Users or employers are encouraged to apply proper judgment to avoid taking unnecessary risks, even if the only immediate hazard is "reversible", such as temporary pain, disorientation, nausea, or non-toxic contamination.

== NIOSH respirator selection logic ==
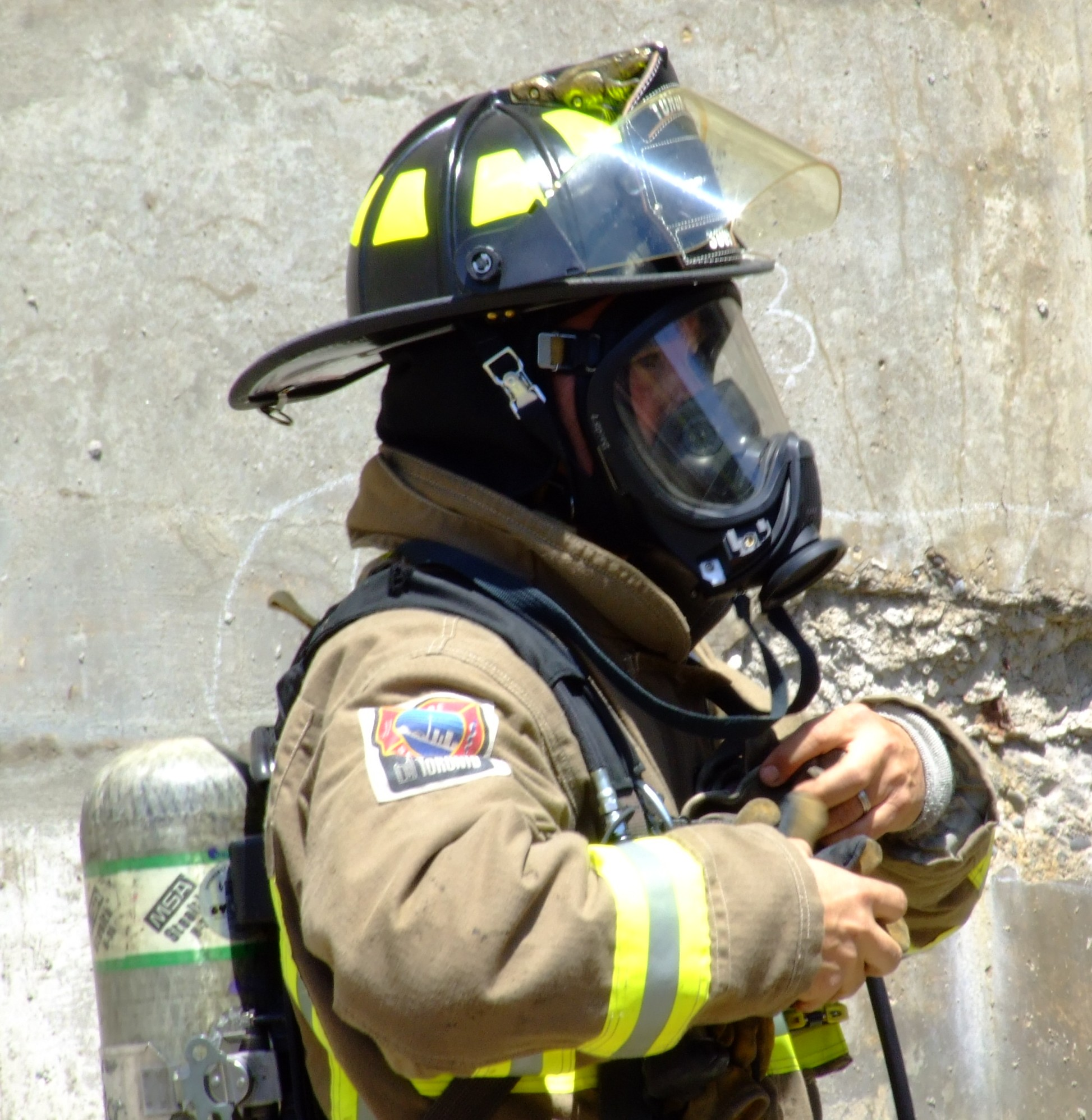
Personal protective equipment for IDLH conditions: pressure-demand self-contained breathing apparatus with a full facepiece

If the concentration of harmful substances is IDLH, the worker must use the most reliable respirators. Such respirators should not use cartridges or canister with the sorbent, as their lifetime is too poorly predicted. In addition, the respirator must maintain positive pressure under the mask during inspiration, as this will prevent the leakage of unfiltered air through the gaps (which occur between the edges of the mask and the face sometimes).

Textbook NIOSH recommended for use in IDLH conditions only pressure-demand self-contained breathing apparatus with a full facepiece, or pressure-demand supplied-air respirator equipped with a full facepiece in combination with an auxiliary pressure-demand self-contained breathing apparatus.

== IDLH values ==
The following examples are listed in reference to IDLH values.

Legend:

Ca
NIOSH considers this substance to be a potential occupational carcinogen. Revised values may follow in parentheses.
N.D.
Not determined. That is, the level is unknown, not non-existent.
10%LEL
The IDLH value has been set at 10% of the lower explosive limit although other irreversible health effects or impairment of escape due to toxicology exist only at higher levels.

IDLH values for gases and vapors, used in industry
Number		Substance	IDLH value		Source
CAS	ICSC	Substance	mg/m^{3}	ppm	Source
75-07-0	0009	Acetaldehyde	3600 mg/m^{3}	2000 ppm	75070
64-19-7	0363	Acetic acid	123 mg/m^{3}	50 ppm	64197
108-24-7	0209	Acetic anhydride	836 mg/m^{3}	200 ppm	108247
67-64-1	0087	Acetone	5900 mg/m^{3}	2500 ppm	67641 (10% Lower explosive limit LEL)
75-05-8	0088	Acetonitrile	840 mg/m^{3}	500 ppm	75058
79-27-6	1235	Acetylene tetrabromide	113.1 mg/m^{3}	8 ppm	79276
107-02-8	0090	Acrolein	4.58 mg/m^{3}	2 ppm	107028
79-06-1	0091	Acrylamide	60 mg/m^{3}	-	79061, carcinogenic substance
107-13-1	0092	Acrylonitrile	184.45 mg/m^{3}	85 ppm	107131
309-00-2	0774	Aldrin	25 mg/m^{3}	-	309002, carcinogenic substance
107-18-6	0095	Allyl alcohol	47.6 mg/m^{3}	20 ppm	107186
107-05-1	0010	Allyl chloride	782.5 mg/m^{3}	250 ppm	107051
106-92-3	0096	Allyl glycidyl ether	233.5 mg/m^{3}	50 ppm	106923
504-29-0	0214	2-Aminopyridine	19.25 mg/m^{3}	5 ppm	504290
7664-41-7	0414	Ammonia	210 mg/m^{3}	300 ppm	7664417
7773-06-0	1555	Ammonium sulfamate	1500 mg/m^{3}	-	7773060
628-63-7	0218	n-Amyl acetate	5330 mg/m^{3}	1000 ppm	628637
626-38-0	0219	sec-Amyl acetate	5330 mg/m^{3}	1000 ppm	626380
62-53-3	0011	Aniline	381 mg/m^{3}	100 ppm	62533, carcinogenic substance
90-04-0	0970	o-Anisidine	50 mg/m^{3}	-	90040
104-94-9	0971	p-Anisidine	50 mg/m^{3}	-	104949
7440-36-0	0775	Antimony	50 mg/m^{3}	-	7440360
86-88-4	0973	ANTU	100 mg/m^{3}	-	86884
7440-38-2	0013	Arsenic	5 mg/m^{3}	-	7440382
7784-42-1	0222	Arsine	9.57 mg/m^{3}	3 ppm	7784421, carcinogenic substance
86-50-0	0826	Azinphos-methyl	10 mg/m^{3}	-	86500
10361-37-2	0614	Barium chloride	50 mg/m^{3}	-	7440393
10022-31-8	1480	Barium nitrate	50 mg/m^{3}	-	7440393
71-43-2	0015	Benzene	1595 mg/m^{3}	500 ppm	71432, carcinogenic substance
94-36-0	0225	Benzoyl peroxide	1500 mg/m^{3}	-	94360
100-44-7	0016	Benzyl chloride	51.8 mg/m^{3}	10 ppm	100447
7440-41-7	0226	Beryllium & beryllium compounds	4 mg/m^{3}	-	7440417
1303-86-2	0836	Boron oxide	2000 mg/m^{3}	-	1303862
7637-07-2	0231	Boron trifluoride	69.3 mg/m^{3}	25 ppm	7637072
7726-95-6	0107	Bromine	19.6 mg/m^{3}	3 ppm	7726956
75-25-2	0108	Bromoform	8789 mg/m^{3}	850 ppm	75252
106-99-0	0017	1,3-Butadiene	4420 mg/m^{3}	2000 ppm	106990, (10% Lower explosive limit LEL); carcinogenic substance
78-93-3	0179	2-Butanone	8850 mg/m^{3}	3000 ppm	78933
111-76-2	0059	2-Butoxyethanol	3381 mg/m^{3}	700 ppm	111762
123-86-4	0399	n-Butyl acetate	8075 mg/m^{3}	1700 ppm	123864, (10% Lower explosive limit LEL)
105-46-4	0840	sec-Butyl acetate	8075 mg/m^{3}	1700 ppm	105464 (10% Lower explosive limit LEL)
540-88-5	1445	tert-Butyl acetate	7125 mg/m^{3}	1500 ppm	540885, (10% Lower explosive limit LEL)
71-36-3	0111	n-Butyl alcohol	4242 mg/m^{3}	1400 ppm	71363
78-92-2	0112	sec-Butyl alcohol	6060 mg/m^{3}	2000 ppm	78922
75-65-0	0114	tert-Butyl alcohol	4848 mg/m^{3}	1600 ppm	75650
109-73-9	0374	n-Butylamine	897 mg/m^{3}	300 ppm	109739
1189-85-1	1533	tert-Butyl chromate	15 mg/m^{3}	-	1189851, carcinogenic substance
2426-08-6	0115	n-Butyl glycidyl ether	1332.5 mg/m^{3}	250 ppm	2426086
109-79-5	0018	n-Butyl mercaptan	1845 mg/m^{3}	500 ppm	109795
98-51-1	1068	p-tert-Butyltoluene	607 mg/m^{3}	100 ppm	98511
7440-43-9	0020	Cadmium dust	9 mg/m^{3}	-	7440439, carcinogenic substance
1306-19-0	0020	Cadmium fume	9 mg/m^{3}	-	7440439, carcinogenic substance
7778-44-1	0765	Calcium arsenate	5 mg/m^{3}	-	7778441, carcinogenic substance
1305-78-8	0409	Calcium oxide	25 mg/m^{3}	-	1305788
76-22-2	1021	Camphor	200 mg/m^{3}	-	76222
63-25-2	0121	Carbaryl	100 mg/m^{3}	-	63252
1333-86-4	0471	Carbon black	1750 mg/m^{3}	-	1333864
124-38-9	0021	Carbon dioxide	72000 mg/m^{3}	40000 ppm	124389
75-15-0	0022	Carbon disulfide	1555 mg/m^{3}	500 ppm	75150
630-08-0	0023	Carbon monoxide	1380 mg/m^{3}	1200 ppm	630080
56-23-5	0024	Carbon tetrachloride	1258 mg/m^{3}	200 ppm	56235, carcinogenic substance
57-74-9	0740	Chlordane	100 mg/m^{3}	-	57749, carcinogenic substance
8001-35-2	0843	Chlorinated camphene	200 mg/m^{3}	-	8001352, carcinogenic substance
31242–93–0	-	Chlorinated diphenyl oxide	5 mg/m^{3}	-	31242930
7782-50-5	0126	Chlorine	29 mg/m^{3}	10 ppm	7782505
10049-04-4	0127	Chlorine dioxide	13.35 mg/m^{3}	5 ppm	10049044
7790-91-2	0656	Chlorine trifluoride	75.6 mg/m^{3}	20 ppm	7790912
107-20-0	0706	Chloroacetaldehyde	144.5 mg/m^{3}	45 ppm	107200
532-27-4	0128	α-Chloroacetophenone	15 mg/m^{3}	-	532274
108-90-7	0642	Chlorobenzene	4610 mg/m^{3}	1000 ppm	108907
2698-41-1	1065	o-Chlorobenzylidene malonitrile	2 mg/m^{3}	-	2698411
74-97-5	0392	Chlorobromomethane	10580 mg/m^{3}	2000 ppm	74975
53469-21-9	0175	Chlorodiphenyl (42% chlorine)	5 mg/m^{3}	-	53469219, carcinogenic substance
11097-69-1	0939	Chlorodiphenyl (54% chlorine)	5 mg/m^{3}	-	53469219, carcinogenic substance
67-66-3	0027	Chloroform	2440 mg/m^{3}	500 ppm	67663, carcinogenic substance
600-25-9	1423	1-Chloro-1-nitropropane	5.06 mg/m^{3}	100 ppm	600259
76-06-2	0750	Chloropicrin	13.44 mg/m^{3}	2 ppm	76062
126-99-8	0133	β-Chloroprene	10.86 mg/m^{3}	300 ppm	126998, carcinogenic substance
1333-82-0	1194	Chromium trioxide	15 mg/m^{3}	-	1333820, carcinogenic substance
-	-	Chromium(II)	250 mg/m^{3}	-	cr2m3
-	-	Chromium(III)	25 mg/m^{3}	-	cr3m3
7440-47-3	0029	Chromium	250 mg/m^{3}	-	7440473
65996-93-2	1415	Coal tar pitch volatiles	80 mg/m^{3}	-	65996932, carcinogenic substance
7440-48-4	0782	Cobalt	20 mg/m^{3}	-	7440484
7440-50-8	0240	Copper	100 mg/m^{3}	-	7440508
-	-	Cotton dust (raw)	100 mg/m^{3}	-	cotdust
136-78-7	1142	Crag® herbicide	500 mg/m^{3}	-	136787
108-39-4	0646	m-Cresol	1107.5 mg/m^{3}	250 ppm	cresol
95-48-7	0030	o-Cresol	1107.5 mg/m^{3}	250 ppm	cresol
106-44-5	0031	p-Cresol	1107.5 mg/m^{3}	250 ppm	cresol
4170-30-3	0241	Crotonaldehyde	143.5 mg/m^{3}	50 ppm	123739
98-82-8	0170	Cumene	4428 mg/m^{3}	900 ppm	98828 (10% Lower explosive limit LEL)
110-82-7	0242	Cyclohexane	4472 mg/m^{3}	1300 ppm	110827
108-93-0	0243	Cyclohexanol	1640 mg/m^{3}	400 ppm	108930
108-94-1	0425	Cyclohexanone	2814 mg/m^{3}	700 ppm	108941
110-83-8	1054	Cyclohexene	6720 mg/m^{3}	2000 ppm	110838
542-92-7	0857	Cyclopentadiene	2025 mg/m^{3}	750 ppm	542927 (10% Lower explosive limit LEL)
13121-70-5	-	Cyhexatin	80 mg/m^{3} (25 mg/m^{3} - for Sn)	-	tin-org
94-75-7	0033	2,4-D	100 mg/m^{3}	-	94757
50-29-3	0034	DDT	500 mg/m^{3}	-	50293, carcinogenic substance
17702-41-9	0712	Decaborane	15 mg/m^{3}	-	17702419
8065-48-3	0861	Demeton	10 mg/m^{3}	-	8065483
123-42-2	0647	Diacetone alcohol	8550 mg/m^{3}	1800 ppm	123422
334-88-3	1256	Diazomethane	3.44 mg/m^{3}	2 ppm	334883 (10% Lower explosive limit LEL)
19287-45-7	0432	Diborane	16.95 mg/m^{3}	15 ppm	19287457
107-66-4	1278	Dibutyl phosphate	258 mg/m^{3}	30 ppm	107664
84-74-2	0036	Dibutyl phthalate	4000 mg/m^{3}	-	84742
95-50-1	1066	o-Dichlorobenzene	1202 mg/m^{3}	200 ppm	95501
106-46-7	0037	p-Dichlorobenzene	906 mg/m^{3}	150 ppm	106467, carcinogenic substance
75-71-8	0048	Dichlorodifluoromethane	7425 mg/m^{3}	15000 ppm	75718
118-52-5	-	1,3-Dichloro-5,5-dimethylhydantoin	5 mg/m^{3}	-	118525
75-34-3	0249	1,1-Dichloroethane	12150 mg/m^{3}	3000 ppm	75343
540-59-0	0436	1,2-Dichloroethylene	3970 mg/m^{3}	1000 ppm	540590
111-44-4	0417	Dichloroethyl ether	585 mg/m^{3}	100 ppm	111444, carcinogenic substance
75-43-4	1106	Dichloromonofluoromethane	21050 mg/m^{3}	5000 ppm	75434
594-72-9	0434	Dichloronitroethane	147.3 mg/m^{3}	25 ppm	594729
76-14-2	0649	Dichlorotetrafluoroethane	104850 mg/m^{3}	15000 ppm	76142
62-73-7	0872	Dichlorvos	100 mg/m^{3}	-	62737
60-57-1	0787	Dieldrin	50 mg/m^{3}	-	60571, carcinogenic substance
109-89-7	0444	Diethylamine	5980 mg/m^{3}	200 ppm	109897
100-37-8	0257	2-Diethylaminoethanol	479 mg/m^{3}	100 ppm	100378
75-61-6	1419	Difluorodibromomethane	17160 mg/m^{3}	2000 ppm	75616
2238-07-5	0145	Diglycidyl ether	53.3 mg/m^{3}	10 ppm	2238075, carcinogenic substance
108-83-8	0713	Diisobutyl ketone	2910 mg/m^{3}	500 ppm	108838
108-18-9	0449	Diisopropylamine	828 mg/m^{3}	200 ppm	108189
127-19-5	0259	Dimethyl acetamide	1068 mg/m^{3}	300 ppm	127195
124-40-3	1485	Dimethylamine	925 mg/m^{3}	500 ppm	124403
121-69-7	0877	N,N-Dimethylaniline	4.96 mg/m^{3}	100 ppm	121697
300-76-5	0925	Naled	200 mg/m^{3}	-	300765
68-12-2	0457	Dimethylformamide	1495 mg/m^{3}	500 ppm	68122
57-14-7	0147	1,1-Dimethylhydrazine	371.5 mg/m^{3}	15 ppm	57147, carcinogenic substance
131-11-3	0261	Dimethylphthalate	2000 mg/m^{3}	-	131113
77-78-1	0148	Dimethyl sulfate	36.1 mg/m^{3}	7 ppm	77781, carcinogenic substance
99-65-0	0691	m-Dinitrobenzene	50 mg/m^{3}	-	528290
528-29-0	0460	o-Dinitrobenzene	50 mg/m^{3}	-	528290
100-25-4	0692	p-Dinitrobenzene	50 mg/m^{3}	-	528290
534-52-1	0462	Dinitro-o-cresol	5 mg/m^{3}	-	534521
25321-14-6	0465	Dinitrotoluene	50 mg/m^{3}	-	25321146, carcinogenic substance
117-81-7	0271	Di-sec octyl phthalate	5000 mg/m^{3}	-	117817, carcinogenic substance
123-91-1	0041	Dioxane	1800 mg/m^{3}	500 ppm	123911, carcinogenic substance
92-52-4	0106	Diphenyl	100 mg/m^{3}	-	92524
34590-94-8	0884	Dipropylene glycol methyl ether	3636 mg/m^{3}	600 ppm	34590948
72-20-8	1023	Endrin	2 mg/m^{3}	-	72208
106-89-8	0043	Epichlorohydrin	283.5 mg/m^{3}	75 ppm	106898, carcinogenic substance
2104-64-5	0753	EPN	5 mg/m^{3}	-	2104645
141-43-5	0152	Ethanolamine	75 mg/m^{3}	30 ppm	141435
110-80-5	0060	2-Ethoxyethanol	1845 mg/m^{3}	500 ppm	110805
111-15-9	0364	2-Ethoxyethyl acetate	2705 mg/m^{3}	500 ppm	111159
141-78-6	0367	Ethyl acetate	7200 mg/m^{3}	2000 ppm	141786 (10% Lower explosive limit LEL)
140-88-5	0267	Ethyl acrylate	1227 mg/m^{3}	500 ppm	140885, carcinogenic substance
64-17-5	0044	Ethyl alcohol	6237 mg/m^{3}	3300 ppm	64175 (10% Lower explosive limit LEL)
75-04-7	1482	Ethylamine	1110 mg/m^{3}	600 ppm	75047
100-41-4	0268	Ethyl benzene	3472 mg/m^{3}	800 ppm	100414 (10% Lower explosive limit LEL)
74-96-4	1378	Ethyl bromide	8920 mg/m^{3}	2000 ppm	74964
106-35-4	0889	Ethyl butyl ketone	4670 mg/m^{3}	1000 ppm	106354
75-00-3	0132	Ethyl chloride	10032 mg/m^{3}	3800 ppm	75003 (10% Lower explosive limit LEL)
107-07-3	0236	Ethylene chlorohydrin	23 mg/m^{3}	7 ppm	107073
107-15-3	0269	Ethylenediamine	2460 mg/m^{3}	1000 ppm	107153
106-93-4	0045	Ethylene dibromide	769 mg/m^{3}	100 ppm	106934, carcinogenic substance
107-06-2	0250	Ethylene dichloride	202.5 mg/m^{3}	50 ppm	107062, carcinogenic substance
628-96-6	1056	Ethylene glycol dinitrate	75 mg/m^{3}	-	628966
151-56-4	0100	Ethyleneimine	176 mg/m^{3}	100 ppm	151564, carcinogenic substance
75-21-8	0155	Ethylene oxide	1440 mg/m^{3}	800 ppm	html, carcinogenic substance
60-29-7	0355	Ethyl ether	5757 mg/m^{3}	1900 ppm	60297 (10% Lower explosive limit LEL)
109-94-4	0623	Ethyl formate	4545 mg/m^{3}	1500 ppm	109944
75-08-1	0470	Ethyl mercaptan	1270 mg/m^{3}	500 ppm	75081
100-74-3	0480	N-Ethylmorpholine	471 mg/m^{3}	100 ppm	100743
78-10-4	0333	Ethyl silicate	5964 mg/m^{3}	700 ppm	78104
14484-64-1	0792	Ferbam	800 mg/m^{3}	-	14484641
12604-58-9	-	Ferrovanadium dust	500 mg/m^{3}	-	12604589
7782-41-4	0046	Fluorine	38.8 mg/m^{3}	25 ppm	7782414
75-69-4	0047	Fluorotrichloromethane	11240 mg/m^{3}	2000 ppm	75694
50-00-0	0695	Formaldehyde	24.6 mg/m^{3}	20 ppm	50000, carcinogenic substance
-	0695	Formalin	24.6 mg/m^{3}	20 ppm	50000, carcinogenic substance
64-18-6	0485	Formic acid	56.4 mg/m^{3}	30 ppm	64186
98-01-1	0276	Furfural	393 mg/m^{3}	100 ppm	98011
98-00-0	0794	Furfuryl alcohol	300.8 mg/m^{3}	75 ppm	98000
556-52-5	0159	Glycidol	454.5 mg/m^{3}	150 ppm	556525
7782-42-5	0893	Graphite (natural)	1250 mg/m^{3}	-	7782425
7440-58-6	0847	Hafnium	50 mg/m^{3}	-	7440586
76-44-8	0743	Heptachlor	35 mg/m^{3}	-	76448, carcinogenic substance
142-82-5	0657	n-Heptane	3075 mg/m^{3}	750 ppm	142825
67-72-1	0051	Hexachloroethane	2904 mg/m^{3}	300 ppm	67721, carcinogenic substance
1335-87-1	0997	Hexachloronaphthalene	2 mg/m^{3}	-	1335871
110-54-3	0279	n-Hexane	3883 mg/m^{3}	1100 ppm	110543 (10% Lower explosive limit LEL)
591-78-6	0489	2-Hexanone	6560 mg/m^{3}	1600 ppm	591786
108-10-1	0511	Hexone	2050 mg/m^{3}	500 ppm	108101
108-84-9	1335	sec-Hexyl acetate	2950 mg/m^{3}	500 ppm	108849
302-01-2	0281	Hydrazine	65.5 mg/m^{3}	50 ppm	302012, carcinogenic substance
10035-10-6	0282	Hydrogen bromide	99.3 mg/m^{3}	30 ppm	10035106
7647-01-0	0163	Hydrogen chloride	74.5 mg/m^{3}	50 ppm	7647010
74-90-8	0492	Hydrogen cyanide	55 mg/m^{3}	50 ppm	74908
7664-39-3	0283	Hydrogen fluoride	24.6 mg/m^{3}	30 ppm	7664393
7722-84-1	-	Hydrogen peroxide	104 mg/m^{3}	75 ppm	772841
7783-07-5	0284	Hydrogen selenide	3.3 mg/m^{3}	1 ppm	7783075
7783-06-4	0165	Hydrogen sulfide	140 mg/m^{3}	100 ppm	7783064
123-31-9	0166	Hydroquinone	50 mg/m^{3}	-	123319
7553-56-2	0167	Iodine	20.76 mg/m^{3}	2 ppm	7553562
1309-37-1	1577	Iron(III) oxide	2500 mg/m^{3}	-	1309371
123-92-2	0356	Isoamyl acetate	5330 mg/m^{3}	1000 ppm	123922
123-51-3	0798	Isoamyl alcohol (primary)	1805 mg/m^{3}	500 ppm	123513
6032-29-7	-	Isoamyl alcohol (secondary)	1805 mg/m^{3}	500 ppm	123513
110-19-0	0494	Isobutyl acetate	6175 mg/m^{3}	1300 ppm	110190 (10% Lower explosive limit LEL)
78-83-1	0113	Isobutyl alcohol	4848 mg/m^{3}	1600 ppm	78831
78-59-1	0169	Isophorone	1130 mg/m^{3}	200 ppm	78591
108-21-4	0907	Isopropyl acetate	7524 mg/m^{3}	1800 ppm	108214
67-63-0	0554	Isopropyl alcohol	4920 mg/m^{3}	2000 ppm	67630 (10% Lower explosive limit LEL)
75-31-0	0908	Isopropylamine	1815 mg/m^{3}	750 ppm	75310
108-20-3	0906	Isopropyl ether	5852 mg/m^{3}	1400 ppm	108203 (10% Lower explosive limit LEL)
4016-14-2	0171	Isopropyl glycidyl ether	1900 mg/m^{3}	400 ppm	4016142
463-51-4	0812	Ketene	8.6 mg/m^{3}	5 ppm	463514
7439-92-1	0052	Lead	100 mg/m^{3}	-	7439921
58-89-9	0053	Lindane	50 mg/m^{3}	-	58899
7580-67-8	0813	Lithium hydride	0.5 mg/m^{3}	-	7580678
68476-85-7	-	L.P.G.	3440–4740 mg/m^{3}	2000 ppm	68476857 (10% Lower explosive limit LEL)
1309-48-4	0504	Magnesium oxide fume	750 mg/m^{3}	-	1309484
121-75-5	0172	Malathion	250 mg/m^{3}	-	121755
108-31-6	0799	Maleic anhydride	10 mg/m^{3}	-	108316
7439-96-5	0174	Manganese	500 mg/m^{3}	-	7439965
7439-97-6	0056	Mercury	10 mg/m^{3}	-	7439976
-	1304	Mercury (organo) alkyl compounds	2 mg/m^{3}	-	merc-hg
141-79-7	0814	Mesityl oxide	5628 mg/m^{3}	1400 ppm	141797 (10% Lower explosive limit LEL)
72-43-5	1306	Methoxychlor	5000 mg/m^{3}	-	72435, carcinogenic substance
79-20-9	0507	Methyl acetate	9393 mg/m^{3}	3100 ppm	79209 (10% Lower explosive limit LEL)
74-99-7	0560	Methyl acetylene	2788 mg/m^{3}	1700 ppm	74997 (10% Lower explosive limit LEL)
59355-75-8	-	Methyl acetylene-propadiene mixture	5576 mg/m^{3}	3400 ppm	59355758 (10% Lower explosive limit LEL)
96-33-3	0625	Methyl acrylate	880 mg/m^{3}	250 ppm	96333
109-87-5	1152	Methylal	6842 mg/m^{3}	2200 ppm	109875 (10% Lower explosive limit LEL)
67-56-1	0057	Methyl alcohol	7860 mg/m^{3}	6000 ppm	67561
74-89-5	1483	Methylamine	127 mg/m^{3}	100 ppm	74895
110-43-0	0920	Methyl (n-amyl) ketone	3736 mg/m^{3}	800 ppm	110430
74-83-9	0109	Methyl bromide	972 mg/m^{3}	250 ppm	74839, carcinogenic substance
109-86-4	0061	Methyl Cellosolve	622 mg/m^{3}	200 ppm	109864
110-49-6	0476	Methyl Cellosolve acetate	966 mg/m^{3}	200 ppm	110496
74-87-3	0419	Methyl chloride	4140 mg/m^{3}	2000 ppm	74873, carcinogenic substance
71-55-6	0079	Methyl chloroform	3822 mg/m^{3}	700 ppm	71556
108-87-2	0923	Methylcyclohexane	4824 mg/m^{3}	1200 ppm	108872 (10% Lower explosive limit LEL)
25639-42-3	0292	Methylcyclohexanol	2335 mg/m^{3}	500 ppm	25639423
583-60-8	-	2-Methylcyclohexanone	2754 mg/m^{3}	600 ppm	583608
101-68-8	0298	Methylene bisphenyl isocyanate	75 mg/m^{3}	-	101688
75-09-2	0058	Methylene chloride	7981 mg/m^{3}	2300 ppm	75092, carcinogenic substance
107-31-3	0664	Methyl formate	11070 mg/m^{3}	4500 ppm	107313
541-85-5	1391	5-Methyl-3-heptanone	524 mg/m^{3}	100 ppm	541855
60-34-4	0180	Methyl hydrazine	37.8 mg/m^{3}	20 ppm	60344, carcinogenic substance
74-88-4	0509	Methyl iodide	580 mg/m^{3}	100 ppm	74884, carcinogenic substance
108-11-2	0665	Methyl isobutyl carbinol	1672 mg/m^{3}	400 ppm	108112
624-83-9	0004	Methyl isocyanate	7 mg/m^{3}	3 ppm	624839
74-93-1	0299	Methyl mercaptan	295.5 mg/m^{3}	150 ppm	74931
80-62-6	0300	Methyl methacrylate	4090 mg/m^{3}	1000 ppm	80626
98-83-9	0732	alpha-Methylstyrene	3381 mg/m^{3}	700 ppm	98839
12001-26-2	-	Mica	1500 mg/m^{3}	-	12001262
7439-98-7	1003	Molybdenum	5000 mg/m^{3}	-	7439987
-	1003	Molybdenum, soluble compounds	1000 mg/m^{3}	-	moly-mo
100-61-8	0921	Monomethyl aniline	438 mg/m^{3}	100 ppm	100618
110-91-8	0302	Morpholine	1400 mg/m^{3}	4984 ppm	110918 (10% Lower explosive limit LEL)
8030-30-6	-	Naphtha (coal tar)	4500 mg/m^{3}	1000 ppm	8030306 (10% Lower explosive limit LEL)
91-20-3	0667	Naphthalene	1310 mg/m^{3}	250 ppm	91203
13463-39-3	0064	Nickel carbonyl	14 mg/m^{3}	2 ppm	13463393, carcinogenic substance
7440-02-0	0062	Nickel	10 mg/m^{3}	-	7440020, carcinogenic substance
54-11-5	0519	Nicotine	5 mg/m^{3}	-	54115
7697-37-2	0183	Nitric acid	64.5 mg/m^{3}	25 ppm	7697372
10102-43-9	1311	Nitric oxide	123 mg/m^{3}	100 ppm	10102439
100-01-6	0308	p-Nitroaniline	300 mg/m^{3}	-	100016
98-95-3	0065	Nitrobenzene	1008 mg/m^{3}	200 ppm	98953
100-00-5	0846	p-Nitrochlorobenzene	100 mg/m^{3}	-	100005
79-24-3	0817	Nitroethane	3070 mg/m^{3}	1000 ppm	79243
10102-44-0	0930	Nitrogen dioxide	37.6 mg/m^{3}	20 ppm	10102440
7783-54-2	1234	Nitrogen trifluoride	2900 mg/m^{3}	2000 ppm	7783542
55-63-0	0186	Nitroglycerine	75 mg/m^{3}	-	55630
75-52-5	0522	Nitromethane	1875 mg/m^{3}	750 ppm	75525
108-03-2	1050	1-Nitropropane	3640 mg/m^{3}	1000 ppm	108032
79-46-9	0187	2-Nitropropane	354 mg/m^{3}	100 ppm	79469, carcinogenic substance
99-08-1	1411	m-Nitrotoluene	1122 mg/m^{3}	200 ppm	88722
88-72-2	0931	o-Nitrotoluene	1122 mg/m^{3}	200 ppm	88722
99-99-0	0932	p-Nitrotoluene	1122 mg/m^{3}	200 ppm	88722
2234-13-1	1059	Octachloronaphthalene	~1 mg/m^{3}	-	2234131
111-65-9	0933	Octane	4670 mg/m^{3}	1000 ppm	111659 (10% Lower explosive limit LEL)
8012-95-1	-	Oil mist (mineral)	2500 mg/m^{3}	-	8012951
20816-12-0	0528	Osmium tetroxide	1 mg/m^{3}	-	20816120
7783-41-7	0818	Oxygen difluoride	1 mg/m^{3}	0.5 ppm	7783417
10028-15-6	0068	Ozone	9.8 mg/m^{3}	5 ppm	10028156
1910-42-5	0005	Paraquat	1 mg/m^{3}	-	1910425
56-38-2	0006	Parathion	10 mg/m^{3}	-	56382
19624-22-7	0819	Pentaborane	2.6 mg/m^{3}	1 ppm	19624227
87-86-5	0069	Pentachlorophenol	2.5 mg/m^{3}	-	87865
109-66-0	0534	n-Pentane	4425 mg/m^{3}	1500 ppm	109660 (10% Lower explosive limit LEL)
107-87-9	0816	2-Pentanone	5280 mg/m^{3}	1500 ppm	107879
594-42-3	0311	Perchloromethyl mercaptan	10 mg/m^{3}	76 ppm	594423
7616-94-6	1114	Perchloryl fluoride	419 mg/m^{3}	100 ppm	7616946
8002-05-9		Petroleum distillates (naphtha)	4455 mg/m^{3}	1100 ppm	8002059 (10% Lower explosive limit LEL)
108-95-2	0070	Phenol	962 mg/m^{3}	250 ppm	108952
106-50-3	0805	p-Phenylene diamine	25 mg/m^{3}	-	106503
101-84-8	0791	Phenyl ether	100 mg/m^{3}	696 ppm	101848
122-60-1	0188	Phenyl glycidyl ether	614 mg/m^{3}	100 ppm	122601, carcinogenic substance
100-63-0	0938	Phenylhydrazine	66.3 mg/m^{3}	15 ppm	100630, carcinogenic substance
7786-34-7	0924	Phosdrin	36.7 mg/m^{3}	4 ppm	7786347
75-44-5	0007	Phosgene	8.1 mg/m^{3}	2 ppm	75445
7803-51-2	0694	Phosphine	69.5 mg/m^{3}	50 ppm	7803512
7664-38-2	1008	Phosphoric acid	1000 mg/m^{3}	-	7664382
7723-14-0	0628	Phosphorus (yellow)	5 mg/m^{3}	-	7723140.html 7723140
10026-13-8	0544	Phosphorus pentachloride	70 mg/m^{3}	-	10026138
1314-80-3	1407	Phosphorus pentasulfide	250 mg/m^{3}	-	1314803
7719-12-2	0696	Phosphorus trichloride	140 mg/m^{3}	25 ppm	7719122
85-44-9	0315	Phthalic anhydride	60 mg/m^{3}	-	85449
88-89-1	0316	Picric acid	75 mg/m^{3}	-	88891
83-26-1	1515	Pindone	100 mg/m^{3}	-	83261
-	-	Platinum (soluble salts, as Pt)	4 mg/m^{3}	-	platinum
65997-15-1	1425	Portland cement	5000 mg/m^{3}	-	65997151
151-50-8	0671	Potassium cyanide	25 mg/m^{3}	-	cyanides
74-98-6	0319	Propane	3780 mg/m^{3}	2100 ppm	74986 (10% Lower explosive limit LEL)
109-60-4	0940	n-Propyl acetate	7106 mg/m^{3}	1700 ppm	109604
71-23-8	0553	n-Propyl alcohol	1968 mg/m^{3}	800 ppm	71238
78-87-5	0441	Propylene dichloride	1848 mg/m^{3}	400 ppm	78875, carcinogenic substance
75-55-8	0322	Propylene imine	234 mg/m^{3}	100 ppm	75558, carcinogenic substance
75-56-9	0192	Propylene oxide	952 mg/m^{3}	400 ppm	75569, carcinogenic substance
627-13-4	1513	n-Propyl nitrate	2150 mg/m^{3}	500 ppm	627134
8003-34-7	1475	Pyrethrum	5000 mg/m^{3}	-	8003347
110-86-1	0323	Pyridine	3240 mg/m^{3}	1000 ppm	110861
106-51-4	0779	Quinone	100 mg/m^{3}	-	106514
7440-16-6	1247	Rhodium (metal fume and insoluble compounds, as Rh)	100 mg/m^{3}	-	rhodium
-	-	Rhodium (soluble compounds, as Rh)	2 mg/m^{3}	-	rhodium
299-84-3	0975	Ronnel	300 mg/m^{3}	-	299843
83-79-4	0944	Rotenone	2500 mg/m^{3}	-	83794
7782-49-2	0072	Selenium	1 mg/m^{3}	-	7782492
7783-79-1	0947	Selenium hexafluoride	15.8 mg/m^{3}	2 ppm	7783791
7631-86-9	-	Silica, amorphous	3000 mg/m^{3}	-	7631869
14808-60-7	0808	Silica, crystalline	25/50 mg/m^{3}	-	14808607, carcinogenic substance (25 mg/m^{3} – cristobalite, tridymite; 50 mg/m^{3} – crystalline silica)
7440-22-4	0810	Silver	10 mg/m^{3}	-	7440224
-	-	Soapstone (containing less than 1% quartz)	3000 mg/m^{3}	-	soapston
15096-52-3	1565	Sodium aluminum fluoride	250 mg/m^{3}	-	fluoride
143-33-9	1118	Sodium cyanide	25 mg/m^{3}	-	cyanides
7681-49-4	0951	Sodium fluoride	250 mg/m^{3}	-	fluoride
62-74-8	0484	Sodium fluoroacetate	2.5 mg/m^{3}	-	62748
1310-73-2	0360	Sodium hydroxide	10 mg/m^{3}	-	1310732
7803-52-3	0776	Stibine	25.5 mg/m^{3}	5 ppm	7803523
8052-41-3	0361	Stoddard solvent	20 000 mg/m^{3}	-	8052413
57-24-9	0197	Strychnine	3 mg/m^{3}	-	57249
100-42-5	0073	Styrene	2982 mg/m^{3}	700 ppm	100425
7446-09-5	0074	Sulfur dioxide	262 mg/m^{3}	100 ppm	7446095
7664-93-9	0362	Sulfuric acid	15 mg/m^{3}	-	7664939
10025-67-9	0958	Sulfur monochloride	27.6 mg/m^{3}	5 ppm	10025679
5714-22-7	-	Sulfur pentafluoride	10.4 mg/m^{3}	1 ppm	5714227
2699-79-8	1402	Sulfuryl fluoride	836 mg/m^{3}	200 ppm	2699798
93-76-5	0075	2,4,5-Trichlorophenoxyacetic acid	250 mg/m^{3}	-	93765
14807-96-6	0329	Talc	1000 mg/m^{3}	-	14807966
7440-25-7	1596	Tantalum	2500 mg/m^{3}	-	7440257
3689-24-5	0985	TEDP	10 mg/m^{3}	-	3689245
13494-80-9	0986	Tellurium	25 mg/m^{3}	-	13494809
7783-80-4	-	Tellurium hexafluoride	9.9 mg/m^{3}	1 ppm	7783804
107-49-3	1158	TEPP	5 mg/m^{3}	-	107493
92-06-8	-	m-Terphenyl	500 mg/m^{3}	-	26140603
84-15-1	1525	o-Terphenyl	500 mg/m^{3}	-	26140603
92-94-4	-	p-Terphenyl	500 mg/m^{3}	-	26140603
76-11-9	1420	1,1,1,2-Tetrachloro-2,2-difluoroethane	16680 mg/m^{3}	2000 ppm	76119
76-12-0	1421	Freon 112	16680 mg/m^{3}	2000 ppm	76120
79-34-5	0332	1,1,2,2-Tetrachloroethane	687 mg/m^{3}	100 ppm	79345, carcinogenic substance
127-18-4	0076	Tetrachloroethylene	1017 mg/m^{3}	150 ppm	127184, carcinogenic substance
78-00-2	0008	Tetraethyl lead	40 mg/m^{3}	-	78002
109-99-9	0578	Tetrahydrofuran	5900 mg/m^{3}	2000 ppm	109999 (10% Lower explosive limit LEL)
75-74-1	0200	Tetramethyl lead	40 mg/m^{3}	-	75741
3333-52-6	1121	Tetramethyl succinonitrile	27.9 mg/m^{3}	5 ppm	3333526
509-14-8	1468	Tetranitromethane	32 mg/m^{3}	4 ppm	509148
479-45-8	0959	Tetryl	750 mg/m^{3}	-	479458
-	-	Thallium (soluble compounds)	15 mg/m^{3}	-	thallium
137-26-8	0757	Thiram	100 mg/m^{3}	-	137268
7440-31-5	1535	Tin	100 mg/m^{3}	-	7440315
-	-	Tin (organic compounds)	25 mg/m^{3}	-	tin-org
13463-67-7	0338	Titanium dioxide	5000 mg/m^{3}	-	13463677, carcinogenic substance
108-88-3	0078	Toluene	1885 mg/m^{3}	500 ppm	108883
584-84-9	0339	Toluene-2,4-diisocyanate	17.8 mg/m^{3}	2.5 ppm	584849, carcinogenic substance
95-53-4	0341	o-Toluidine	219 mg/m^{3}	50 ppm	95534, carcinogenic substance
126-73-8	0584	Tributyl phosphate	327 mg/m^{3}	30 ppm	126738
79-00-5	0080	1,1,2-Trichloroethane	546 mg/m^{3}	100 ppm	79005, carcinogenic substance
79-01-6	0081	Trichloroethylene	5370 mg/m^{3}	1000 ppm	79016, carcinogenic substance
96-18-4	0683	1,2,3-Trichloropropane	603 mg/m^{3}	100 ppm	96184, carcinogenic substance
76-13-1	0050	1,1,2-Trichloro-1,2,2-trifluoroethane	15340 mg/m^{3}	2000 ppm	76131
121-44-8	0203	Triethylamine	828 mg/m^{3}	200 ppm	121448
75-63-8	0837	Trifluorobromomethane	243 600 mg/m^{3}	40 000 ppm	75638
118-96-7	0967	2,4,6-Trinitrotoluene	500 mg/m^{3}	-	118967
78-30-8	0961	Triorthocresyl phosphate	40 mg/m^{3}	-	78308
115-86-6	1062	Triphenyl phosphate	1000 mg/m^{3}	-	115866
8006-64-2	1063	Turpentine	4448 mg/m^{3}	8000 ppm	8006642
7440-61-1	1251	Uranium (insoluble compounds)	10 mg/m^{3}	-	7440611, carcinogenic substance
-	-	Uranium (soluble compounds)	10 mg/m^{3}	-	uranium, carcinogenic substance
7440-62-2	-	Vanadium dust	35 mg/m^{3}	-	vandust
1314-62-1	-	Vanadium fume	35 mg/m^{3}	-	vanfume
25013-15-4	0514	Vinyl toluene	1932 mg/m^{3}	400 ppm	25013154
81-81-2	0821	Warfarin	100 mg/m^{3}	-	81812
108-38-3	0085	m-Xylene	3906 mg/m^{3}	900 ppm	95476
95-47-6	0084	o-Xylene	3906 mg/m^{3}	900 ppm	95476
106-42-3	0086	p-Xylene	3906 mg/m^{3}	900 ppm	95476
1300-73-8	0600	Xylidine	248 mg/m^{3}	50 ppm	1300738
7440-65-5	-	Yttrium	500 mg/m^{3}	-	7440655
7646-85-7	1064	Zinc chloride fume	50 mg/m^{3}	-	7646857
1314-13-2	0208	Zinc oxide	500 mg/m^{3}	-	1314132
7440-67-7	1405	Zirconium compounds	25 mg/m^{3}	-	7440677

IDLH values for several gases and vapors (military)
Number		Substance	IDLH value		Source
CAS	ICSC	Substance	mg/m^{3}	ppm	Source
7782-50-5	0126	Chlorine	29 mg/m^{3}	10 ppm	7782505
100-44-7	0016	Benzyl chloride (used in chemical weapons)	51.8 mg/m^{3}	10 ppm	100447
77-78-1	0148	Dimethyl sulfate (used in chemical weapons)	36.1 mg/m^{3}	7 ppm	77781, carcinogenic substance
76-06-2	0750	Chloropicrin	13.44 mg/m^{3}	2 ppm	76062
75-44-5	0007	Phosgene (used in chemical weapons)	8.1 mg/m^{3}	2 ppm	75445
5714-22-7	-	Sulfur pentafluoride	~10.4 mg/m^{3}	1 ppm	5714227
505-60-2	0418	Sulfur mustard	~4.7 mg/m^{3}	0.7 ppm	29750008
77-81-6	-	Tabun	~0.7 mg/m^{3}	0.1 ppm	nerve
77-81-6	-	Sarin	~0.6 mg/m^{3}	0.1 ppm	nerve
96-64-0	-	Soman (Zoman)	~0.4 mg/m^{3}	0.05 ppm	nerve
329-99-7	-	Cyclosarin	~0.4 mg/m^{3}	0.05 ppm	nerve
50782-69-9 51848-47-6 53800-40-1	-	VX	~0.034 mg/m^{3}	0.003 ppm	nerve

== See also ==
- NIOSH air filtration rating
