= Ethyl acetate (data page) =

Chemical data page

This page provides supplementary chemical data on ethyl acetate.

== Material Safety Data Sheet ==
The handling of this chemical may incur notable safety precautions. It is highly recommended that you seek the Material Safety Datasheet (MSDS) for this chemical from a reliable source and follow its directions.

- Science Stuff
- Baker
- Fisher
- Eastman

== Structure and properties ==
Structure and properties
Index of refraction, n_{D}	1.3720
Abbe number	?
Dielectric constant, ε_{r}	6.02 ε_{0} at 25 °C
Bond strength	?
Bond length	?
Bond angle	?
Magnetic susceptibility	?
Surface tension	23.9 dyn/cm at 20 °C
Viscosity	0.5285 mPa·s at 0 °C; 0.4546 mPa·s at 20 °C; 0.3668 mPa·s at 40 °C

== Thermodynamic properties ==
Phase behavior
Triple point	189.3 K (−83.9 °C), ? Pa
Critical point	530 K (260 °C), 3900 kPa
Std enthalpy change of fusion, Δ_{fus}H^{~~o~~}	10.48 kJ/mol (189.3 K)
Std entropy change of fusion, Δ_{fus}S^{~~o~~}	55.27 J/(mol·K) (189.3 K)
Std enthalpy change of vaporization, Δ_{vap}H^{~~o~~}	31.94 kJ/mol
Std entropy change of vaporization, Δ_{vap}S^{~~o~~}	103.35 J/(mol·K)
Solid properties
Std enthalpy change of formation, Δ_{f}H^{~~o~~}_{solid}	? kJ/mol
Standard molar entropy, S^{~~o~~}_{solid}	? J/(mol K)
Heat capacity, c_{p}	? J/(mol K)
Liquid properties
Std enthalpy change of formation, Δ_{f}H^{~~o~~}_{liquid}	−480 kJ/mol
Standard molar entropy, S^{~~o~~}_{liquid}	259.4 J/(mol K)
Heat capacity, c_{p}	170 J/(mol K)
Gas properties
Std enthalpy change of formation, Δ_{f}H^{~~o~~}_{gas}	−445 kJ/mol
Standard molar entropy, S^{~~o~~}_{gas}	363 J/(mol K)
Heat capacity, c_{p}	125.8 J/(mol K) (360 K)
van der Waals' constants	a = 2072.0 L^{2} kPa/mol^{2} b = 0.1412 liter per mole

== Distillation data ==
Vapor-liquid Equilibrium for Ethyl Acetate/Water; P = 760 mmHg
BP Temp. °C	% by mole C_{4}H_{8}O_{2}
BP Temp. °C	liquid	vapor
100.0	0.0	0.0
96.5	0.024	10.0
92.9	0.055	20.0
89.5	0.105	30.0
85.9	0.201	40.0
82.1	0.370	50.0
77.5	0.683	60.0
74.3	0.935	65.0
70.5	3.0	70.0
70.4	5.0	70.1
70.4	10.0	70.1
70.4	20.0	70.1
70.4	30.0	70.1
70.4	40.0	70.1
70.4	50.0	70.1
70.4	60.0	70.1
70.4	70.0	70.1
70.7	80.0	70.5
72.2	90.0	75.0
73.5	94.1	80.0
74.5	96.5	85.0
75.5	97.5	90.0
76.3	98.8	95.0
77.2	100.0	100.0

Vapor-liquid Equilibrium for Ethyl Acetate/Acetic acid P = 740 mmHg
BP Temp. °C	% by mole C_{4}H_{8}O_{2}
BP Temp. °C	liquid	vapor
117.07	0.0	0.0
114.00	4.0	10.7
110.00	9.6	23.0
105.00	17.3	37.7
100.00	25.9	51.9
95.00	36.3	65.4
90.00	48.2	77.7
86.00	61.7	86.3
82.00	76.4	93.4
80.00	84.2	96.1
78.00	92.2	98.3
76.30	100.0	100.0

Vapor-liquid Equilibrium for Ethyl Acetate/Ethanol; P = 760 mmHg
BP Temp. °C	% by mole C_{2}H_{6}O_{1}
BP Temp. °C	liquid	vapor
76.7	2.5	7.0
75.5	8.0	12.6
75.0	10.0	16.4
74.4	13.0	20.0
72.6	24.0	29.5
71.8	36.0	39.8
72.0	56.3	50.7
72.4	65.3	56.0
72.8	71.0	60.0
73.1	73.5	62.7
73.5	77.6	66.5
73.6	78.5	67.5
74.2	83.3	73.5
74.9	87.3	77.3
75.0	87.8	78.3
75.6	90.8	82.3
76.1	93.2	86.8
76.4	94.2	88.0
77.7	98.4	96.5

== Spectral data ==
UV-Vis
λ_{max}	? nm
Extinction coefficient, ε	?
IR
Major absorption bands	2983, 1743, 1374, 1243, 1048 cm^{−1}
NMR
Proton NMR	δ CDCl_{3} 4.12 (2H, q), 2.04 (3H, s), 1.26 (3H, t).
Carbon-13 NMR	δ CDCl_{3} 171.1, 60.4, 21.0, 14.3.
Other NMR data	J_{H-H} (in ethyl), 7.1 Hz.
MS
Masses of main fragments	88.0 (5.1%), 70.0 (9.9%), 61.0 (14.9%), 45.0 (14.7%), 43.0 (100.0%), 29.0 (13.7%)
