= Di-tert-butyl chromate =

tert-Butyl chromate
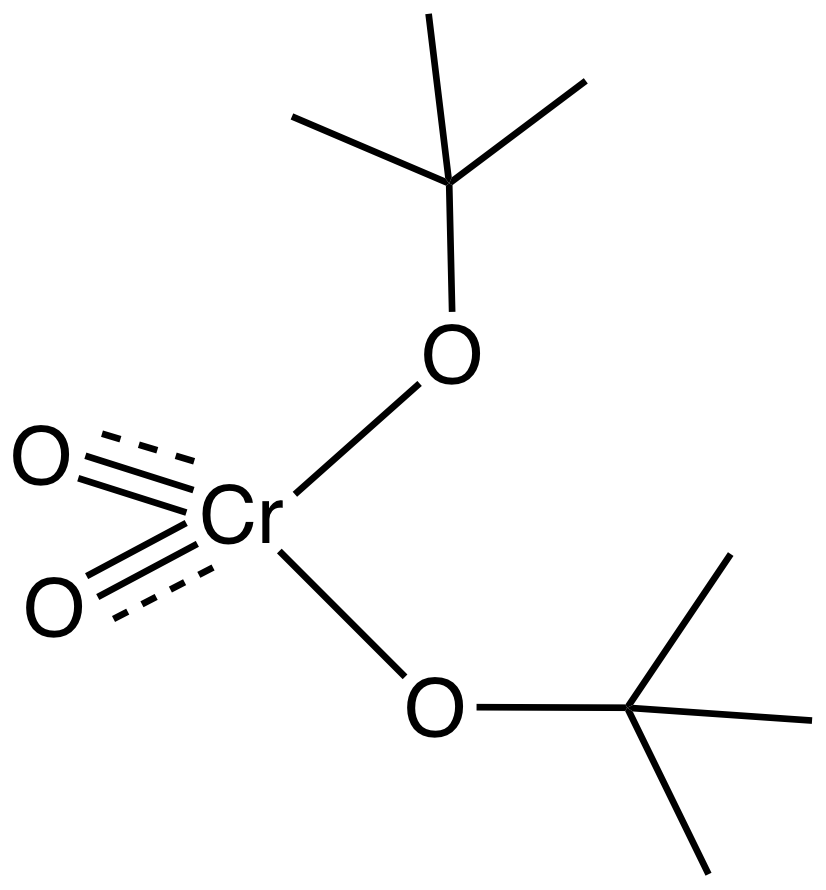

Names
- IUPAC name tert-Butyl chromate
- Other names Di-tert-butyl ester of chromic acid; Bis(tert-butyl)chromate

Identifiers
CAS Number	1189-85-1
3D model (JSmol)	Interactive image
ChemSpider	11649895
PubChem CID	102059956 wrong formula
RTECS number	GB2900000
CompTox Dashboard (EPA)	DTXSID401015717
- InChI: InChI=1S/2C4H9O.Cr.2O/c2*1-4(2,3)5;;;/h2*1-3H3;;;/q2*-1;+2;; Key: PNWJTIFZRHJYLK-UHFFFAOYSA-N; InChI=1/2C4H9O.Cr.2O/c2*1-4(2,3)5;;;/h2*1-3H3;;;/q2*-1;+2;;/rC8H18CrO4/c1-7(2,3)12-9(10,11)13-8(4,5)6/h1-6H3 Key: PNWJTIFZRHJYLK-PZTLRDNSAU
- SMILES: O([Cr](OC(C)(C)C)(=O)=O)C(C)(C)C

Properties
Chemical formula	[(CH_{3})_{3}CO]_{2}CrO_{2}
Molar mass	230.3 g/mol
Appearance	red oil
Melting point	−2.8 °C (27.0 °F; 270.3 K)
Solubility in water	Miscible

Hazards
- NIOSH (US health exposure limits)
PEL (Permissible)	TWA 0.005 mg CrO3/m^{3} [skin]
REL (Recommended)	Ca TWA 0.001 mg Cr(VI)/m^{3}
IDLH (Immediate danger)	Ca [15 mg/m^{3} {as Cr(VI)}]
- Except where otherwise noted, data are given for materials in their standard state (at 25 °C [77 °F], 100 kPa). Infobox references

Di-tert-butyl chromate is an alkoxide with the formula CrO_{2}(OC(CH_{3})_{3})_{2}. It forms red crystals at temperatures below −5 °C, above which it melts to give a red oil. The complex, which is diamagnetic, is of fundamental interest as a model for the intermediates in oxidations of alcohols by chromium(VI). This ester is stable because tertiary alcohols such as tert-butyl alcohol lack alpha hydrogens, stopping the E_{2} elimination required for the oxidation of chromate esters. This complex and its analogues have tetrahedral geometry at chromium, as established by X-ray crystallography of its analogues.

== Preparation ==
It can be prepared from tert-butyl alcohol and chromium trioxide or chromyl chloride.

== Applications ==
It is used as a precursor to chromium-based catalysts, such as the Phillips catalyst, which are employed for the polymerization of ethylene.

== Safety ==
Like other forms of hexavalent chromium, di-tert-butyl chromate is classified as a potential carcinogen by the United States National Institute for Occupational Safety and Health.
