= Tert-Butyl formate =

tert-Butyl formate
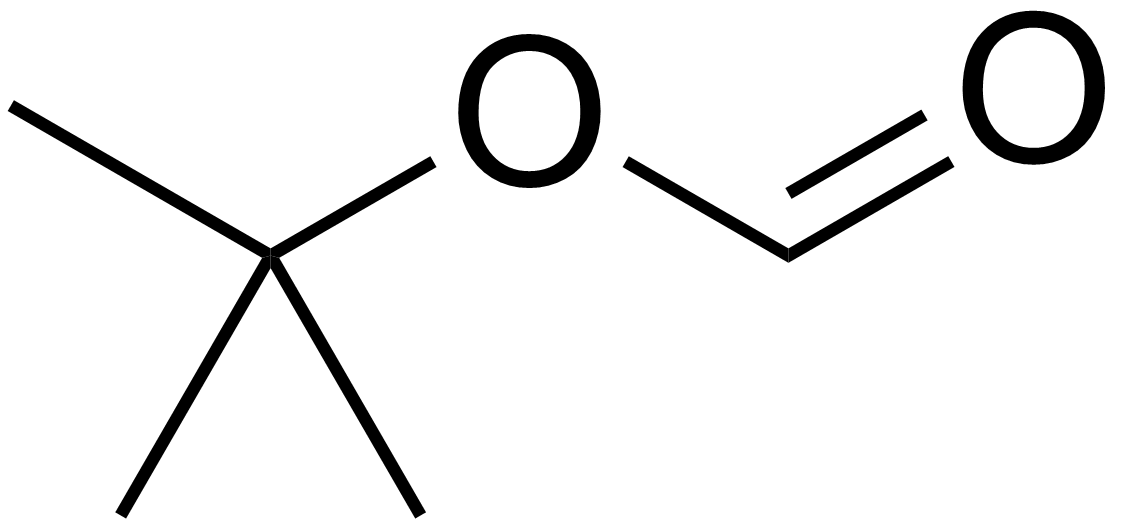

Names
- Preferred IUPAC name tert-Butyl formate
- Other names Formic acid tert-butylester

Identifiers
CAS Number	762-75-4
3D model (JSmol)	Interactive image
Abbreviations	TBF
ChemSpider	55151
DrugBank	DB02768
ECHA InfoCard	100.011.004
EC Number	212-105-0
PubChem CID	61207
UNII	J5BC8DA85J
CompTox Dashboard (EPA)	DTXSID4024690
- InChI: InChI=1S/C5H10O2/c1-5(2,3)7-4-6/h4H,1-3H3 Key: RUPAXCPQAAOIPB-UHFFFAOYSA-N; InChI=1/C5H10O2/c1-5(2,3)7-4-6/h4H,1-3H3 Key: RUPAXCPQAAOIPB-UHFFFAOYAD
- SMILES: CC(C)(C)OC=O

Properties
Chemical formula	C_{5}H_{10}O_{2}
Molar mass	102.133 g·mol^{−1}
Density	0.872 g/mL
Boiling point	82 to 83 °C (180 to 181 °F; 355 to 356 K)

Hazards
- GHS labelling
Pictograms	(GHS02: Flammable) (GHS07: Exclamation mark)
Signal word	Danger
Hazard statements	H225, H319, H335
Precautionary statements	P210, P233, P240, P241, P242, P243, P261, P264, P271, P280, P303+P361+P353, P304+P340, P305+P351+P338, P312, P337+P313, P370+P378, P403+P233, P403+P235, P405, P501
Flash point	−9 °C (16 °F; 264 K)
- Except where otherwise noted, data are given for materials in their standard state (at 25 °C [77 °F], 100 kPa). verify (what is ?) Infobox references

tert-Butyl formate, also known as formic acid tert-butylester and TBF, is a chemical compound with molecular formula C_{5}H_{10}O_{2}. TBF is one of the possible daughter products of methyl tert-butyl ether biodegradation.

== See also ==
- tert-Butyl acetate
