= Sec-Butyl acetate =

sec-Butyl acetate

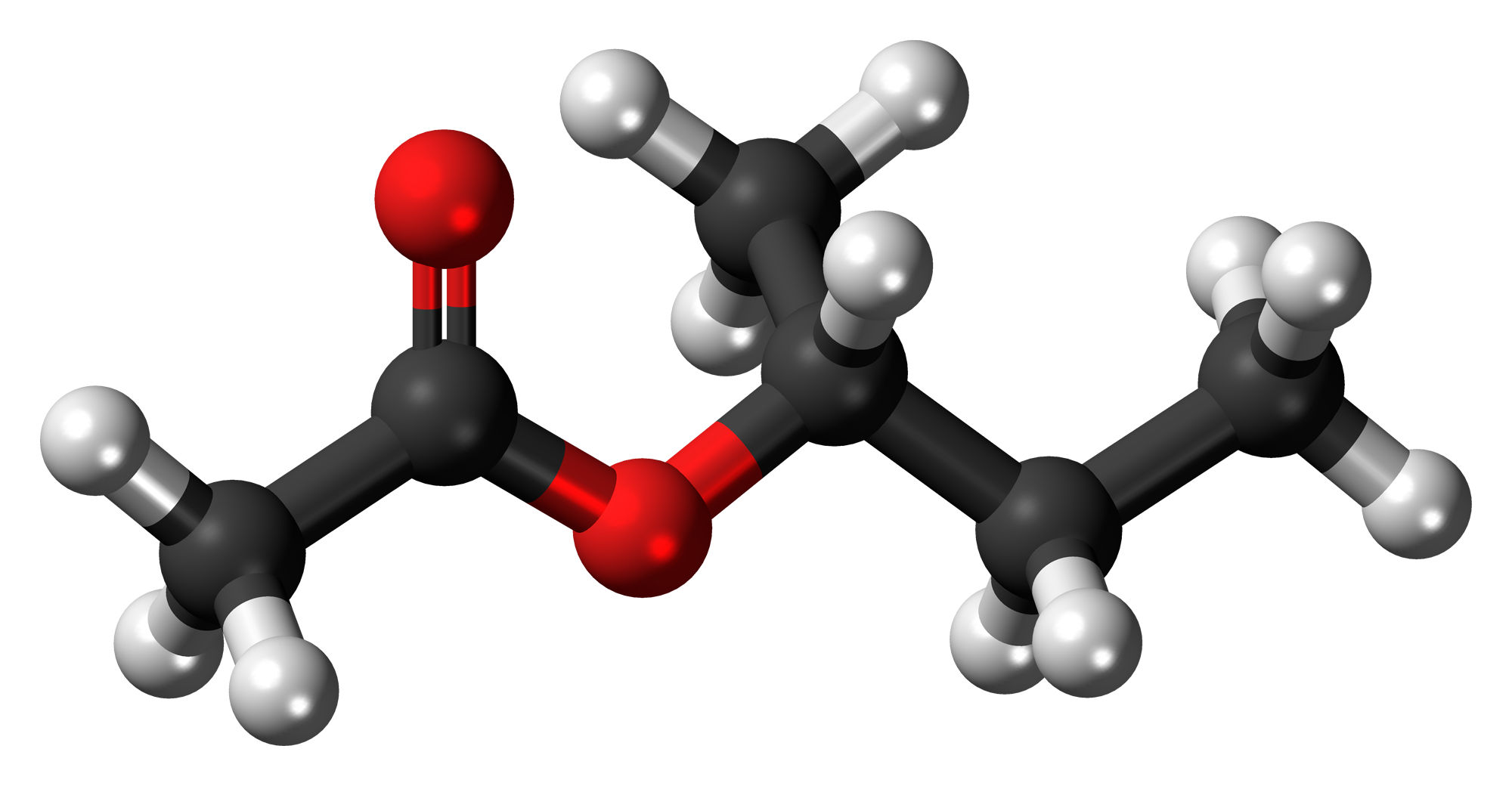

Names
- Preferred IUPAC name Butan-2-yl acetate
- Other names: 2-Butyl acetate; sec-Butyl ester; s-Butyl acetate; sec-Butyl ester of acetic acid; 1-Methylpropyl acetate

Identifiers
CAS Number	105-46-4
3D model (JSmol)	Interactive image
ChemSpider	7472
ECHA InfoCard	100.003.001
PubChem CID	7758
UNII	UVH2QII6CG
CompTox Dashboard (EPA)	DTXSID0047612
- InChI: InChI=1S/C6H12O2/c1-4-5(2)8-6(3)7/h5H,4H2,1-3H3 Key: DCKVNWZUADLDEH-UHFFFAOYSA-N; InChI=1/C6H12O2/c1-4-5(2)8-6(3)7/h5H,4H2,1-3H3 Key: DCKVNWZUADLDEH-UHFFFAOYAV
- SMILES: O=C(OC(C)CC)C

Properties
Chemical formula	C_{6}H_{12}O_{2}
Molar mass	116.160 g·mol^{−1}
Appearance	Clear, liquid
Odor	Fruity
Density	0.87 g/cm^{3}, liquid
Melting point	−99 °C (−146 °F; 174 K)
Boiling point	112 °C (234 °F; 385 K)
Solubility in water	0.80 g/100 mL
Vapor pressure	10 mmHg

Hazards
- Occupational safety and health (OHS/OSH)
Main hazards	Flammable
Flash point	17 °C; 62 °F; 290 K
Explosive limits	1.7–9.8%
- NIOSH (US health exposure limits)
PEL (Permissible)	TWA 200 ppm (950 mg/m^{3})
REL (Recommended)	TWA 200 ppm (950 mg/m^{3})
IDLH (Immediate danger)	1700 ppm
Safety data sheet (SDS)	External MSDS
- Except where otherwise noted, data are given for materials in their standard state (at 25 °C [77 °F], 100 kPa). verify (what is ?) Infobox references

sec-Butyl acetate, or s-butyl acetate, is an ester commonly used as a solvent in lacquers and enamels, where it is used in the production of acyclic polymers, vinyl resins, and nitrocellulose. It is a clear flammable liquid with a sweet smell (solvent, fruity, banana).

sec-Butyl acetate has three isomers that are also acetate esters: n-butyl acetate, isobutyl acetate, and tert-butyl acetate.

== History ==
The first method of production of sec-butyl acetate was the esterification of sec-butanol and acetic anhydride It was experimentally determined and published in 1946 by Rolf Altschul.

== Toxicology ==
The LD_{50} for rats is 13 g/kg. Exposure in humans to significant quantities of sec-butyl acetate can cause irritation to the eyes, mouth, throat, nose, and skin. Ingestion and inhalation of sec-butyl acetate can cause central nervous system depression producing symptoms of dizziness and disorientation.

== Nomenclature ==
sec-Butyl acetate is chiral. It has one stereocenter, carbon 2 in the sec-butyl group. The names of the two enantiomers are:

- [(2S)-butan-2-yl] acetate, (+)-sec-butyl acetate
- [(2R)-butan-2-yl] acetate, (−)-sec-butyl acetate
