= Butyl acetate =

n-Butyl acetate

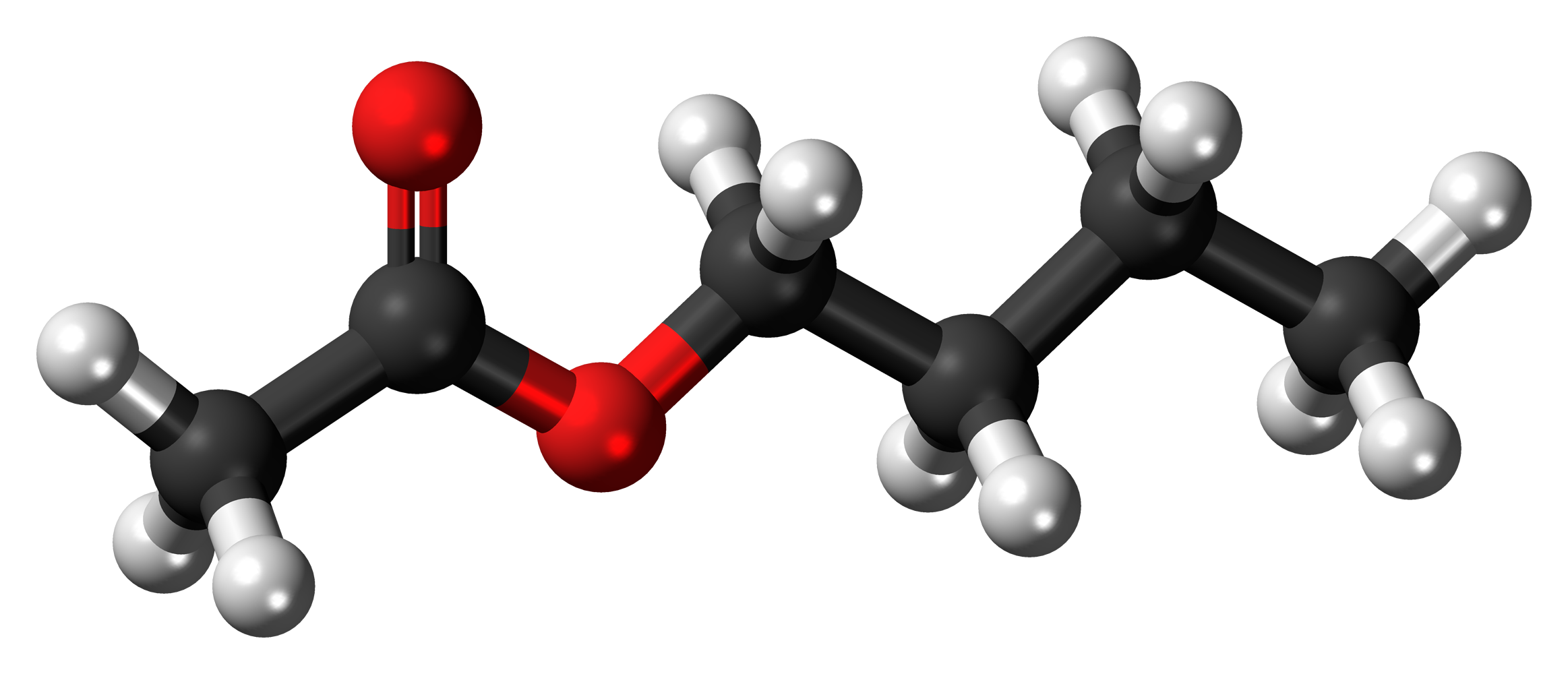

Names
- Preferred IUPAC name Butyl acetate
- Systematic IUPAC name Butyl ethanoate
- Other names n-Butyl acetate Acetic acid n-butyl ester Butile

Identifiers
CAS Number	123-86-4
3D model (JSmol)	Interactive image
Abbreviations	BuAcO
ChEBI	CHEBI:31328
ChEMBL	ChEMBL284391
ChemSpider	29012
ECHA InfoCard	100.004.236
EC Number	204-658-1
KEGG	C12304
PubChem CID	31272
RTECS number	AF7350000
UNII	464P5N1905
UN number	1123
CompTox Dashboard (EPA)	DTXSID3021982
- InChI: InChI=1S/C6H12O2/c1-3-4-5-8-6(2)7/h3-5H2,1-2H3 Key: DKPFZGUDAPQIHT-UHFFFAOYSA-N; InChI=1/C6H12O2/c1-3-4-5-8-6(2)7/h3-5H2,1-2H3 Key: DKPFZGUDAPQIHT-UHFFFAOYAF
- SMILES: CCCCOC(=O)C

Properties
Chemical formula	CH_{3}CO_{2}(CH_{2})_{3}CH_{3}
Molar mass	116.160 g·mol^{−1}
Appearance	Colorless liquid
Odor	Fruity
Density	0.8825 g/cm^{3} (20 °C)
Melting point	−78 °C (−108 °F; 195 K)
Boiling point	126.1 °C (259.0 °F; 399.2 K) at 760 mmHg
Solubility in water	0.68 g/100 mL (20 °C)
Solubility	Miscible in EtOH; Soluble in acetone, CHCl_{3}
log P	1.82
Vapor pressure	0.1 kPa (−19 °C); 1.66 kPa (24 °C); 44.5 kPa (100 °C)
Henry's law constant (k_{H})	0.281 L·atm/mol
Magnetic susceptibility (χ)	−77.47·10^{−6} cm^{3}/mol
Thermal conductivity	0.143 W/m·K (0 °C); 0.136 W/m·K (25 °C); 0.130 W/m·K (50 °C); 0.116 W/m·K (100 °C)
Refractive index (n_{D})	1.3941 (20 °C)
Viscosity	1.002 cP (0 °C); 0.685 cP (25 °C); 0.5 cP (50 °C); 0.305 cP (100 °C)

Structure
Dipole moment	1.87 D (24 °C)

Thermochemistry
Heat capacity (C)	225.11 J/mol·K
Std enthalpy of formation (Δ_{f}H^{⦵}_{298})	−609.6 kJ/mol
Std enthalpy of combustion (Δ_{c}H^{⦵}_{298})	3467 kJ/mol

Hazards
- Occupational safety and health (OHS/OSH)
Main hazards	Flammable
- GHS labelling
Pictograms	(GHS02: Flammable) (GHS07: Exclamation mark)
Signal word	Warning
Hazard statements	H226, H336
Precautionary statements	P261
NFPA 704 (fire diamond)	2 3 0
Flash point	22 °C (72 °F; 295 K)
Autoignition temperature	370 °C (698 °F; 643 K)
Threshold limit value (TLV)	150 ppm (TWA), 200 ppm (STEL)
- Lethal dose or concentration (LD, LC)
LD_{50} (median dose)	10768 mg/kg (~10.8g/kg) (rats, oral)
LC_{50} (median concentration)	160 ppm (rat, 4 hr); 2000 ppm (rat, 4 hr); 391 ppm (rat, 4 hr); 1242 ppm (mouse, 2 hr)
LC_{Lo} (lowest published)	14,079 ppm (cat, 72 min); 13,872 ppm (guinea pig, 4 hr)
- NIOSH (US health exposure limits)
PEL (Permissible)	TWA 150 ppm (710 mg/m^{3})
REL (Recommended)	TWA 150 ppm (710 mg/m^{3}) ST 200 ppm (950 mg/m^{3})
IDLH (Immediate danger)	1700 ppm

Related compounds
Related acetates	Ethyl acetate Propyl acetate Amyl acetate
Related compounds	Butanol
- Except where otherwise noted, data are given for materials in their standard state (at 25 °C [77 °F], 100 kPa). verify (what is ?) Infobox references

n-Butyl acetate is an organic compound with the formula CH_{3}CO_{2}(CH_{2})_{3}CH_{3}. A colorless, flammable liquid, it is the ester derived from n-butanol and acetic acid. It is found in many types of fruit, where it imparts characteristic flavors and has a sweet smell of banana or apple. It is used as an industrial solvent.

The other three isomers (four, including stereoisomers) of butyl acetate are isobutyl acetate, tert-butyl acetate, and sec-butyl acetate (two enantiomers).

== Production and use ==
Butyl acetate is commonly manufactured by the Fischer esterification of n-butanol and acetic acid with the presence of sulfuric acid:

Butyl acetate is mainly used as a solvent for coatings and inks. It is a component of fingernail polish.

== Occurrence in nature ==
Apples, especially of the "Red Delicious" variety, are flavored in part by this chemical. The alarm pheromones emitted by the Koschevnikov gland of honey bees contain butyl acetate.
