= Isobutyl acetate =

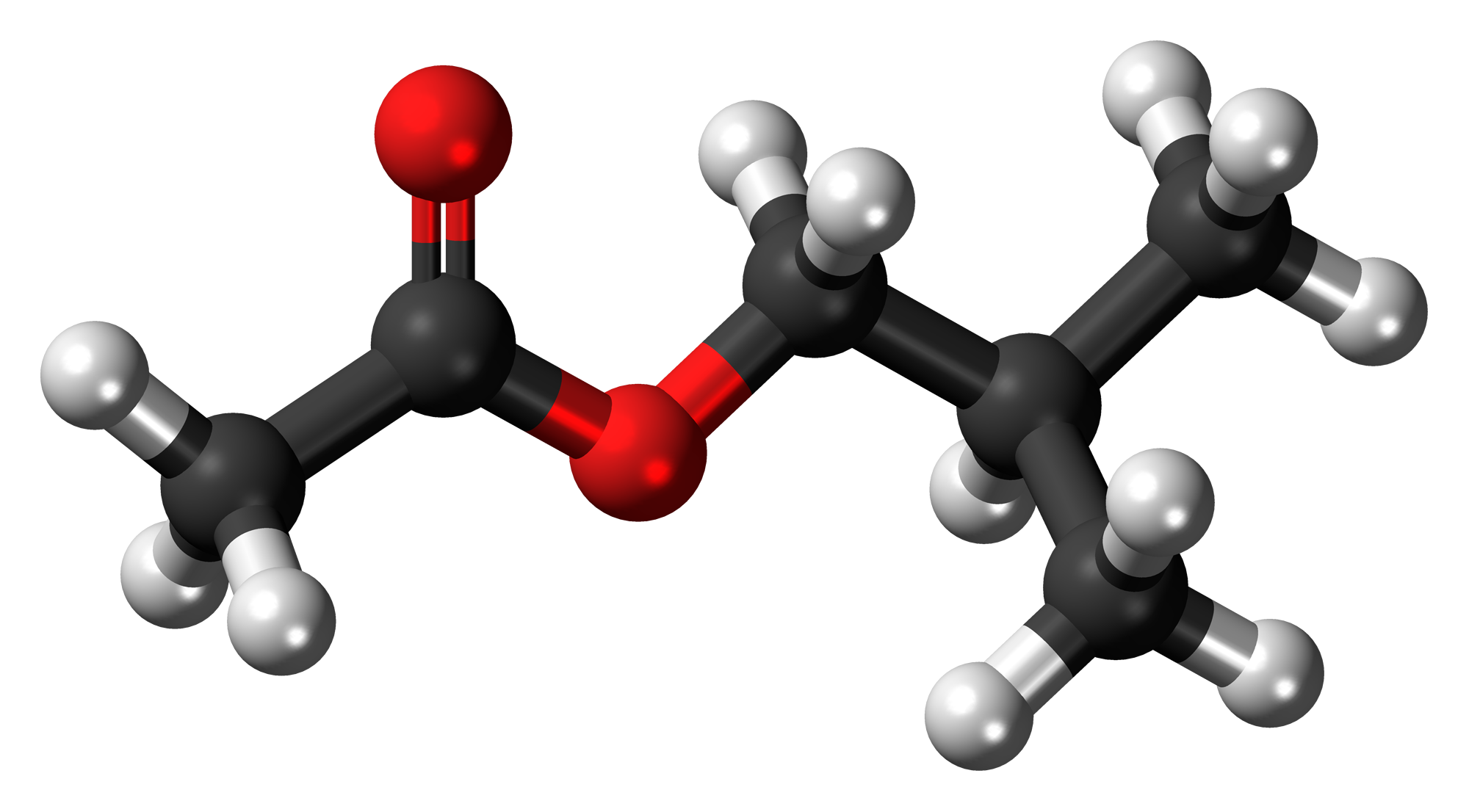

Names
- Preferred IUPAC name 2-Methylpropyl acetate
- Other names Isobutyl acetate Isobutyl ester

Identifiers
CAS Number	110-19-0
3D model (JSmol)	Interactive image
ChEBI	CHEBI:50569
ChEMBL	ChEMBL46999
ChemSpider	7747
ECHA InfoCard	100.003.406
PubChem CID	8038
UNII	7CR47FO6LF
CompTox Dashboard (EPA)	DTXSID5026837
- InChI: InChI=1S/C6H12O2/c1-5(2)4-8-6(3)7/h5H,4H2,1-3H3 Key: GJRQTCIYDGXPES-UHFFFAOYSA-N; InChI=1/C6H12O2/c1-5(2)4-8-6(3)7/h5H,4H2,1-3H3 Key: GJRQTCIYDGXPES-UHFFFAOYAF
- SMILES: O=C(OCC(C)C)C

Properties
Chemical formula	C_{6}H_{12}O_{2}
Molar mass	116.16 g/mol
Appearance	Colourless liquid
Odor	Fruity, floral
Density	0.875 g/cm^{3}, liquid
Melting point	−99 °C (−146 °F; 174 K)
Boiling point	118 °C (244 °F; 391 K)
Solubility in water	Slightly soluble 0.63–0.7 g/100g at 20 °C
Vapor pressure	13 mmHg (20 °C)
Magnetic susceptibility (χ)	−78.52·10^{−6} cm^{3}/mol

Hazards
Flash point	18 °C; 64 °F; 291 K
Explosive limits	1.3–10.5%
- Lethal dose or concentration (LD, LC)
LD_{50} (median dose)	4673 mg/kg (rabbit, oral); 13,400 mg/kg (rat, oral)
- NIOSH (US health exposure limits)
PEL (Permissible)	TWA 150 ppm (700 mg/m^{3})
REL (Recommended)	TWA 150 ppm (700 mg/m^{3})
IDLH (Immediate danger)	1300 ppm
- Except where otherwise noted, data are given for materials in their standard state (at 25 °C [77 °F], 100 kPa). verify (what is ?) Infobox references

The chemical compound isobutyl acetate, also known as 2-methylpropyl ethanoate (IUPAC name) or β-methylpropyl acetate, is a common solvent. It is produced from the esterification of isobutanol with acetic acid. It is used as a solvent for lacquer and nitrocellulose. Like many esters it has a fruity or floral aroma (sweet, fruity, ethereal, banana, tropical, apple) at low concentrations and occurs naturally in raspberries, pears and other plants. At higher concentrations the odor can be unpleasant and may cause symptoms of central nervous system depression such as nausea, dizziness and headache.

A common method for preparing isobutyl acetate is Fischer esterification, where precursors isobutyl alcohol and acetic acid are heated in the presence of a strong acid.

Isobutyl acetate has three isomers: n-butyl acetate, tert-butyl acetate, and sec-butyl acetate, which are also common solvents.
