= Tert-Butyl acetate =

tert-Butyl acetate

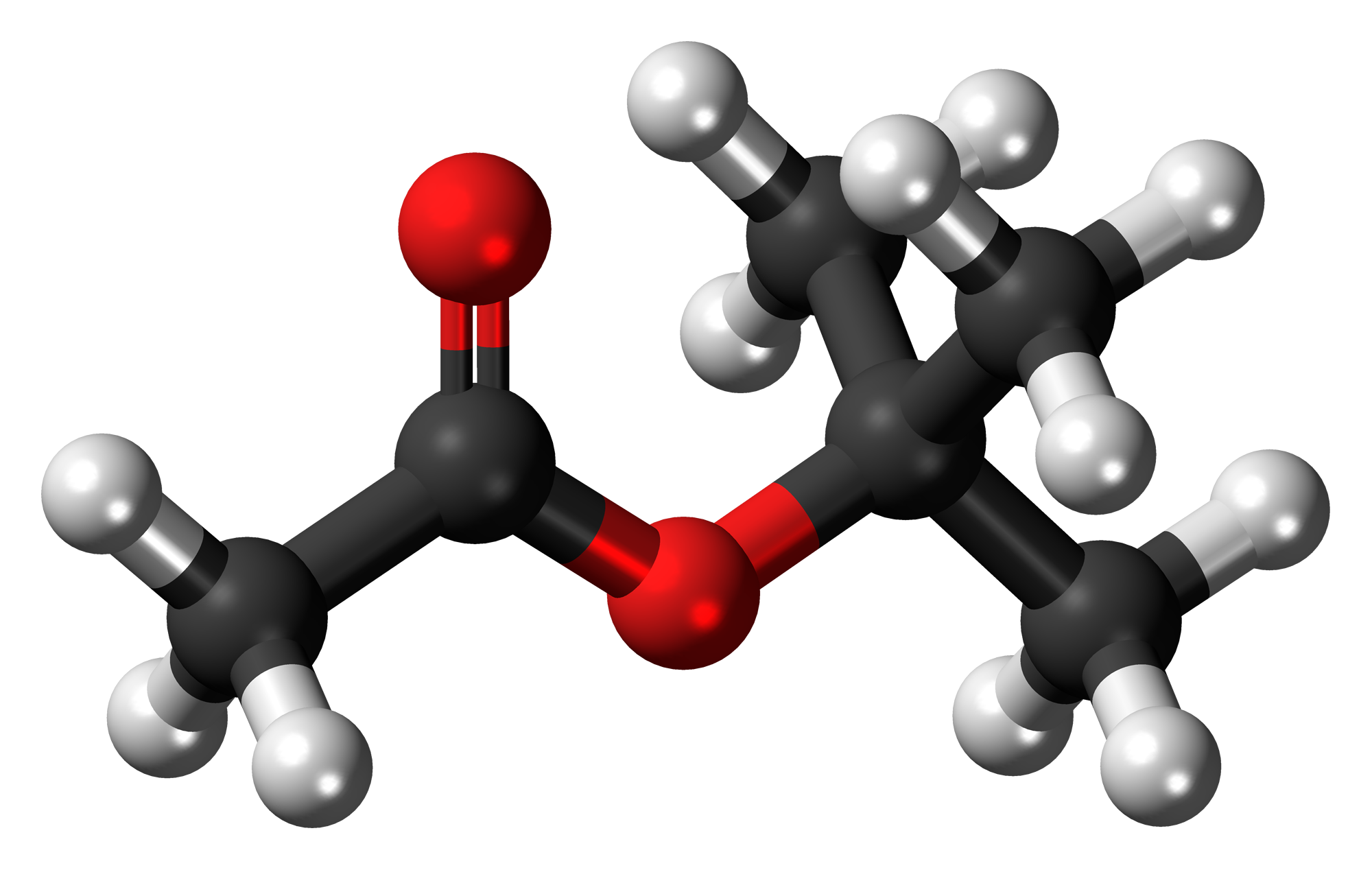

Names
- Preferred IUPAC name tert-Butyl acetate
- Other names: Acetic acid tert-butyl ester; t-Butyl acetate

Identifiers
CAS Number	540-88-5
3D model (JSmol)	Interactive image
ChemSpider	10446
ECHA InfoCard	100.007.965
PubChem CID	10908
UNII	76N22HKP3X
CompTox Dashboard (EPA)	DTXSID1022055
- InChI: InChI=1S/C6H12O2/c1-5(7)8-6(2,3)4/h1-4H3 Key: WMOVHXAZOJBABW-UHFFFAOYSA-N; InChI=1/C6H12O2/c1-5(7)8-6(2,3)4/h1-4H3 Key: WMOVHXAZOJBABW-UHFFFAOYAQ
- SMILES: O=C(OC(C)(C)C)C

Properties
Chemical formula	C_{6}H_{12}O_{2}
Molar mass	116.160 g·mol^{−1}
Appearance	Colorless liquid
Odor	Fruity
Density	0.8593 g/cm^{3}
Boiling point	97.8 °C (208.0 °F; 370.9 K)
Solubility in water	0.8 wt% at 22 °C
Solubility in ether and ethanol	Miscible

Hazards
- Occupational safety and health (OHS/OSH)
Main hazards	Flammable
Flash point	22 °C; 72 °F; 295 K
Explosive limits	From 1.5% to unknown
- NIOSH (US health exposure limits)
PEL (Permissible)	TWA 200 ppm (950 mg/m^{3})
REL (Recommended)	TWA 200 ppm (950 mg/m^{3})
IDLH (Immediate danger)	1500 ppm
- Except where otherwise noted, data are given for materials in their standard state (at 25 °C [77 °F], 100 kPa). verify (what is ?) Infobox references

tert-Butyl acetate (t-butyl acetate or TBAc) is a colorless flammable liquid with a camphor- or blueberry-like smell. It is used as a solvent in the production of lacquers, enamels, inks, adhesives, thinners and industrial cleaners. It has recently gained EPA volatile organic compound (VOC) exempt status.

It is manufactured from acetic acid and isobutylene. An attempt at Fischer esterification would lead to elimination of tert-butyl alcohol to isobutylene.

Butyl acetate has four isomers (or five, including stereoisomers): tert-butyl acetate, n-butyl acetate, isobutyl acetate, and sec-butyl acetate (two enantiomers).

== See also ==
- tert-Butyl formate
- PCBTF VOC Exempt
