= C5H12O =

The molecular formula C_{5}H_{12}O (molar mass: 88.15 g/mol, exact mass: 88.088815) may refer to:

- One of the amyl alcohols:
  - 1-Pentanol
  - tert-Amyl alcohol
  - Isoamyl alcohol
  - Neopentyl alcohol
  - 2-Methyl-1-butanol
  - 3-Methyl-2-butanol
  - 2-Pentanol
  - 3-Pentanol
- An ether:
  - Methyl tert-butyl ether
  - Methyl n-butyl ether (CH_{3}-O-C_{4}H_{9})
