= C5H6O =

The molecular formula C_{5}H_{6}O (molar mass: 82.10 g/mol, exact mass: 82.0419 u) may refer to:

- Cyclopentenone, or 2-cyclopentenone
- Methylfuran
  - 2-Methylfuran
  - 3-Methylfuran
- Pyran, or oxine
