= Methylbutanol =

Methylbutanol may refer to:

- tert-Amyl alcohol (2-methylbutan-2-ol), a branched pentanol
- Isoamyl alcohol (3-methylbutan-1-ol), a colorless liquid
- 2-Methyl-1-butanol, an organic chemical compound
- 3-Methyl-2-butanol, an organic chemical compound used as a solvent and an intermediate
