= Indoor air quality =

Air quality within and around buildings and structures

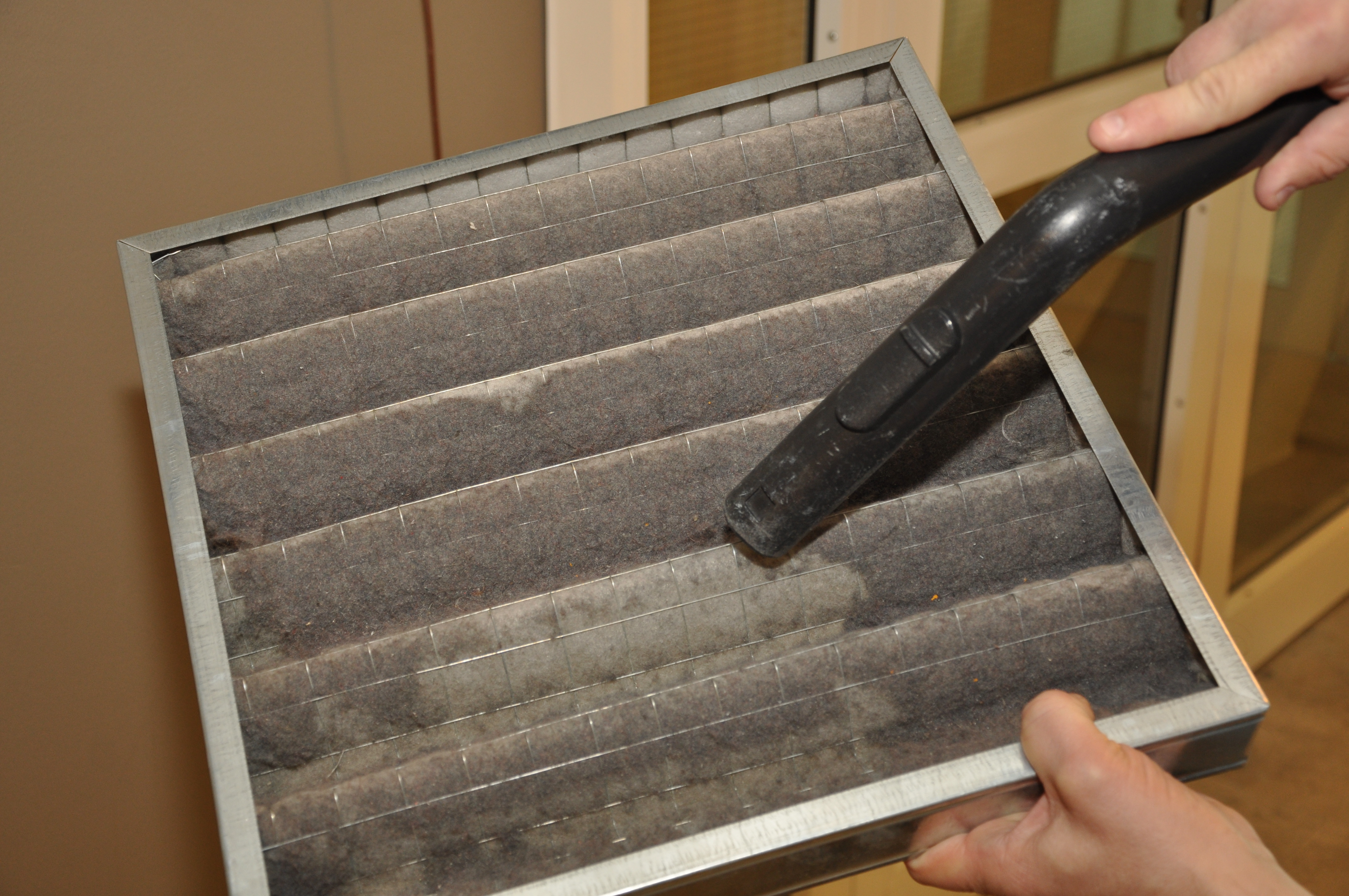
A dirty air filter being cleaned

Indoor air quality (IAQ) is the air quality within buildings and structures. Poor indoor air quality due to indoor air pollution is known to affect the health, comfort, and well-being of building occupants. It has also been linked to sick building syndrome, respiratory issues, reduced productivity, and impaired learning in schools. Common pollutants of indoor air include secondhand tobacco smoke, air pollutants from indoor combustion, radon, molds and other allergens, carbon monoxide, volatile organic compounds, legionella and other bacteria, asbestos fibers, carbon dioxide, ozone and particulates.

Source control, filtration, and the use of ventilation to dilute contaminants are the primary methods for improving indoor air quality. Although ventilation is an integral component of maintaining good indoor air quality, it may not be satisfactory alone. In scenarios where outdoor pollution would deteriorate indoor air quality, other treatment devices such as filtration may also be necessary.

IAQ is evaluated through collection of air samples, monitoring human exposure to pollutants, analysis of building surfaces, and computer modeling of air flow inside buildings. IAQ is part of indoor environmental quality (IEQ), along with other factors that exert an influence on physical and psychological aspects of life indoors (e.g., lighting, visual quality, acoustics, and thermal comfort).

Indoor air pollution is a major health hazard in developing countries and is commonly referred to as "household air pollution" in that context. But severe indoor air quality conditions also can emerge in affluent, highly-developed locales; for example, children fell sick from indoor mold in an apartment complex in Riviera Beach, Florida. Typically, poor indoor air quality is often related to cooking and heating methods by burning biomass fuel, in the form of wood, charcoal, dung, and crop residue, in indoor environments that lack proper ventilation. Millions of people, primarily women and children, face serious health risks. In total, about three billion people in developing countries are affected by this problem. The World Health Organization (WHO) estimates that cooking-related indoor air pollution causes 3.8 million annual deaths. The Global Burden of Disease study estimated the number of deaths in 2017 at 1.6 million.

== Definition ==
Health depends on breathing clean air, free from chemicals and toxicants as much as possible. It is estimated that humans spend approximately 90% of their lifetime indoors and that indoor air pollution in some places can be much worse than that of the ambient air.

Various factors contribute to high concentrations of pollutants indoors, ranging from influx of pollutants from external sources, off-gassing by furniture, furnishings including carpets, indoor activities (cooking, cleaning, painting, smoking, etc. in homes to using office equipment in offices), thermal comfort parameters such as temperature, humidity, airflow and physio-chemical properties of the indoor air. Air pollutants can enter a building in many ways, including through open doors or windows. Poorly maintained air conditioners/ventilation systems can harbor mold, bacteria, and other contaminants, which are then circulated throughout indoor spaces, contributing to respiratory problems and allergies.

There have been many debates among indoor air quality specialists about the proper definition of indoor air quality and specifically what constitutes "acceptable" indoor air quality.

== Health effects ==
Death rate from indoor air pollution

IAQ is significant for human health as humans spend a large proportion of their time in indoor environments. Americans and Europeans on average spend approximately 90% of their time indoors.

The World Health Organization (WHO) estimates that 3.2 million people die prematurely every year from illnesses attributed to indoor air pollution caused by indoor cooking, with over 237 thousand of these being children under 5. These include around an eighth of all global ischaemic heart disease, stroke, and lung cancer deaths. Overall the WHO estimated that poor indoor air quality resulted in the loss of 86 million healthy life years in 2019.

Studies in the UK and Europe show exposure to indoor air pollutants, chemicals and biological contamination can irritate the upper airway system, trigger or exacerbate asthma and other respiratory or cardiovascular conditions, and may even have carcinogenic effects.

Poor indoor air quality can cause sick building syndrome. Symptoms include burning of the eyes, scratchy throat, blocked nose, and headaches.

== Common pollutants ==
Access to clean fuels and technologies for cooking

=== Generated by indoor combustion ===
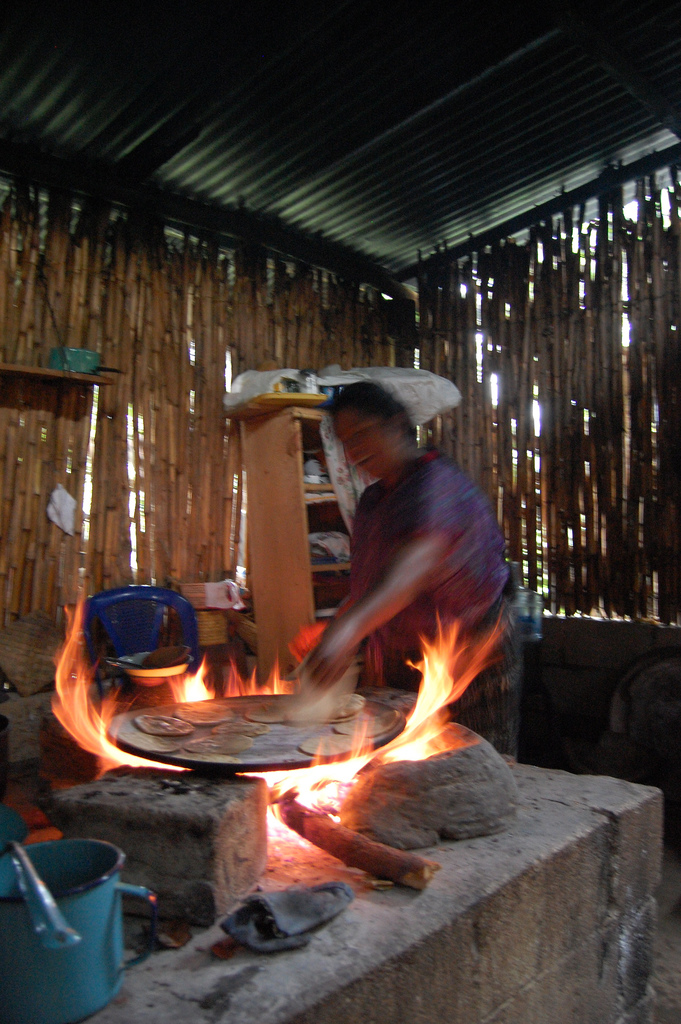
A traditional wood-fired 3-stone stove in Guatemala, which causes indoor air pollution

Indoor combustion, such as for cooking or heating, is a major cause of indoor air pollution and causes significant health harms and premature deaths. Hydrocarbon fires cause air pollution. Pollution is caused by both biomass and fossil fuels of various types, but some forms of fuels are more harmful than others.

Indoor fire can produce black carbon particles, nitrogen oxides, sulfur oxides, and mercury compounds, among other emissions. Around 3 billion people cook over open fires or on rudimentary cook stoves. Cooking fuels are coal, wood, animal dung, and crop residues. IAQ is a particular concern in low and middle-income countries where such practices are common.

Cooking using natural gas (also called fossil gas, methane gas or simply gas) is associated with poorer indoor air quality. Combustion of gas produces nitrogen dioxide and carbon monoxide, and can lead to increased concentrations of nitrogen dioxide throughout the home environment which is linked to respiratory issues and diseases.

==== Carbon monoxide ====
One of the most acutely toxic indoor air contaminants is carbon monoxide (CO), a colorless and odorless gas that is a by-product of incomplete combustion. Carbon monoxide may be emitted from tobacco smoke and generated from malfunctioning fuel burning stoves (wood, kerosene, natural gas, propane) and fuel burning heating systems (wood, oil, natural gas) and from blocked flues connected to these appliances. In developed countries the main sources of indoor CO emission come from cooking and heating devices that burn fossil fuels and are faulty, incorrectly installed or poorly maintained. Appliance malfunction may be due to faulty installation or lack of maintenance and proper use. In low- and middle-income countries the most common sources of CO in homes are burning biomass fuels and cigarette smoke.

Health effects of CO poisoning may be acute or chronic and can occur unintentionally or intentionally (self-harm). By depriving the brain of oxygen, acute exposure to carbon monoxide may have effects on the neurological system (headache, nausea, dizziness, alteration in consciousness and subjective weakness), the cardiovascular and respiratory systems (myocardial infarction, shortness of breath, or rapid breathing, respiratory failure). Acute exposure can also lead to long-term neurological effects such as cognitive and behavioral changes. Severe CO poisoning may lead to unconsciousness, coma and death. Chronic exposure to low concentrations of carbon monoxide may lead to lethargy, headaches, nausea, flu-like symptoms and neuropsychological and cardiovascular issues.

The WHO recommended levels of indoor CO exposure in 24 hours is 4 mg/m^{3}. Acute exposure should not exceed 10 mg/m^{3} in 8 hours, 35 mg/m^{3} in one hour and 100 mg/m^{3} in 15 minutes.

==== Secondhand tobacco smoke ====
Secondhand smoke is tobacco smoke which affects people other than the 'active' smoker. It is made up of the exhaled smoke (15%) and mostly of smoke coming from the burning end of the cigarette, known as sidestream smoke (85%).

Secondhand smoke contains more than 7000 chemicals, of which hundreds are harmful to health. Secondhand tobacco smoke includes both a gaseous and a particulate materials which, with particular hazards arising from levels of carbon monoxide and small particulates (fine particulate matter, especially PM2.5 and PM10) which get into the bronchioles and alveoles in the lung. Inhaling secondhand smoke on multiple occasions can cause asthma, pneumonia, lung cancer, and sudden infant death syndrome, among other conditions.

Thirdhand smoke (THS) refers to chemicals that settle on objects and bodies indoors after smoking. Exposure to thirdhand smoke can happen even after the actual cigarette smoke is not present anymore and affect those entering the indoor environment much later. Toxic substances of THS can react with other chemicals in the air and produce new toxic chemicals that are otherwise not present in cigarettes.

The only certain method to improve indoor air quality as regards secondhand smoke is to eliminate smoking indoors. Indoor e-cigarette use also increases home particulate matter concentrations.

==== Particulates ====
Atmospheric particulate matter, also known as particulates, can be found indoors and can affect the health of occupants. Indoor particulate matter can come from different indoor sources or be created as secondary aerosols through indoor gas-to-particle reactions. They can also be outdoor particles that enter indoors. These indoor particles vary widely in size, ranging from nanomet (nanoparticles/ultrafine particles emitted from combustion sources) to micromet (resuspensed dust). Particulate matter can also be produced through cooking activities. Frying produces higher concentrations than boiling or grilling and cooking meat produces higher concentrations than cooking vegetables. Preparing a Thanksgiving dinner can produce high concentrations of particulate matter, exceeding 300 μg/m^{3}.

Particulates can penetrate deep into the lungs and brain from blood streams, causing health problems such as heart disease, lung disease, cancer and preterm birth.

=== Generated from building materials, furnishing and consumer products ===
==== Volatile organic compounds ====
Volatile organic compounds (VOCs) include a variety of chemicals, some of which may have short- and long-term adverse health effects. There are numerous sources of VOCs indoors, which means that their concentrations are consistently higher indoors (up to ten times higher) than outdoors. Some VOCs are emitted directly indoors, and some are formed through the subsequent chemical reactions that can occur in the gas-phase, or on surfaces. VOCs presenting health hazards include benzene, formaldehyde, tetrachloroethylene and trichloroethylene.

VOCs are emitted by thousands of indoor products. Examples include: paints, varnishes, waxes and lacquers, paint strippers, cleaning and personal care products, pesticides, building materials and furnishings, office equipment such as copiers and printers, correction fluids and carbonless copy paper, graphics and craft materials including glues and adhesives, permanent markers, and photographic solutions. Chlorinated drinking water releases chloroform when hot water is used in the home. Benzene is emitted from fuel stored in attached garages.

Human activities such as cooking and cleaning can also emit VOCs. Cooking can release long-chain aldehydes and alkanes when oil is heated and terpenes can be released when spices are prepared and/or cooked. Leaks of natural gas from cooking appliances have been linked to elevated levels of VOCs including benzene in homes in the USA. Cleaning products contain a range of VOCs, including monoterpenes, sesquiterpenes, alcohols and esters. Once released into the air, VOCs can undergo reactions with ozone and hydroxyl radicals to produce other VOCs, such as formaldehyde.

Health effects include eye, nose, and throat irritation; headaches, loss of coordination, nausea; and damage to the liver, kidney, and central nervous system.

Testing emissions from building materials used indoors has become increasingly common for floor coverings, paints, and many other important indoor building materials and finishes. Indoor materials such as gypsum boards or carpet act as VOC 'sinks', by trapping VOC vapors for extended periods of time, and releasing them by outgassing. The VOCs can also undergo transformation at the surface through interaction with ozone. In both cases, these delayed emissions can result in chronic and low-level exposures to VOCs.

Several initiatives aim to reduce indoor air contamination by limiting VOC emissions from products. There are regulations in France and in Germany, and numerous voluntary ecolabels and rating systems containing low VOC emissions criteria such as EMICODE, M1, Blue Angel and Indoor Air Comfort in Europe, as well as California Standard CDPH Section 01350 and several others in the US. Due to these initiatives an increasing number of low-emitting products became available to purchase.

At least 18 microbial VOCs (MVOCs) have been characterized including 1-octen-3-ol (mushroom alcohol), 3-Methylfuran, 2-pentanol, 2-hexanone, 2-heptanone, 3-octanone, 3-octanol, 2-octen-1-ol, 1-octene, 2-pentanone, 2-nonanone, borneol, geosmin, 1-butanol, 3-methyl-1-butanol, 3-methyl-2-butanol, and thujopsene. The last four are products of Stachybotrys chartarum, which has been linked with sick building syndrome.

==== Asbestos fibers ====
Many common building materials (especially those manufactured in the United States before 1976) contain asbestos, such as some floor tiles, ceiling tiles, shingles, fireproofing, heating systems, pipe wrap, taping muds, mastics, and other insulation materials. Normally, significant releases of asbestos fiber do not occur unless the building materials are disturbed, such as by cutting, sanding, drilling, or building remodeling. Removal of asbestos-containing materials is not always optimal because the fibers can be spread into the air during the removal process. A management program for intact asbestos-containing materials is often recommended instead.

When asbestos-containing material is damaged or disintegrates, microscopic fibers are dispersed into the air. Inhalation of asbestos fibers over long exposure times is associated with increased incidence of lung cancer, mesothelioma, and asbestosis. The risk of lung cancer from inhaling asbestos fibers is significantly greater for smokers. The symptoms of disease do not usually appear until about 20 to 30 years after the first exposure to asbestos.

Although all asbestos is hazardous, products that are friable, e.g. sprayed coatings and insulation, pose a significantly higher hazard as they are more likely to release fibers to the air.

==== Microplastics ====
Microplastic is a type of airborne particulates and is found to prevail in air. A 2017 study found indoor airborne microfiber concentrations between 1.0 and 60.0 microfibers per cubic meter (33% of which were found to be microplastics). Airborne microplastic dust can be produced during renovation, building, bridge and road reconstruction projects and the use of power tools.

==== Ozone ====
Indoors ozone (O_{3}) is produced by certain high-voltage electric devices (such as air ionizers), and as a by-product of other types of pollution. It appears in lower concentrations indoors than outdoors, usually at 0.2–0.7 of the outdoor concentration. Typically, most ozone is lost to surface reactions indoors, rather than to reactions in air, due to the large surface to volume ratios found indoors.

Outdoor air used for ventilation may have sufficient ozone to react with common indoor pollutants as well as skin oils and other common indoor air chemicals or surfaces. Particular concern is warranted when using "green" cleaning products based on citrus or terpene extracts, because these chemicals react rapidly with ozone to form toxic and irritating chemicals as well as fine and ultrafine particles. Ventilation with outdoor air containing elevated ozone concentrations may complicate remediation attempts.

The WHO standard for ozone concentration is 60 μg/m^{3} for long-term exposure and 100 μg/m^{3} as the maximum average over an 8-hour period. The EPA standard for ozone concentration is 0.07 ppm average over an 8-hour period.

=== Biological agents ===
==== Mold and other allergens ====
Occupants in buildings can be exposed to fungal spores, cell fragments, or mycotoxins which can arise from a host of means, but there are two common classes: (a) excess moisture induced growth of mold colonies and (b) natural substances released into the air such as animal dander and plant pollen.

While mold growth is associated with high moisture levels, it is likely to grow when a combination of favorable conditions arises. As well as high moisture levels, these conditions include suitable temperatures, pH and nutrient sources. Mold grows primarily on surfaces, and it reproduces by releasing spores, which can travel and settle in different locations. When these spores experience appropriate conditions, they can germinate and lead to mycelium growth. Different mold species favor different environmental conditions to germinate and grow, some being more hydrophilic (growing at higher levels of relative humidity) and other more xerophilic (growing at levels of relative humidity as low as 75–80%).

Mold growth can be inhibited by keeping surfaces at conditions that are further from condensation, with relative humidity levels below 75%. This usually translates to a relative humidity of indoor air below 60%, in agreement with the guidelines for thermal comfort that recommend a relative humidity between 40 and 60%. Moisture buildup in buildings may arise from water penetrating areas of the building envelope or fabric, from plumbing leaks, rainwater or groundwater penetration, or from condensation due to improper ventilation, insufficient heating or poor thermal quality of the building envelope. Even something as simple as drying clothes indoors on radiators can increase the risk of mold growth, if the humidity produced is not able to escape the building via ventilation.

Mold predominantly affects the airways and lungs. Known effects of mold on health include asthma development and exacerbation, with children and elderly at greater risk of more severe health impacts. Infants in homes with mold have a much greater risk of developing asthma and allergic rhinitis. More than half of adult workers in moldy or humid buildings suffer from nasal or sinus symptoms due to mold exposure. Some varieties of mold contain toxic compounds (mycotoxins). However, exposure to hazardous levels of mycotoxin via inhalation is not possible in most cases, as toxins are produced by the fungal body and are not at significant levels in the released spores.

==== Legionella ====
Legionnaires' disease is caused by a waterborne bacterium Legionella that grows best in slow-moving or still, warm water. The primary route of exposure is through the creation of an aerosol effect, most commonly from evaporative cooling towers or showerheads. A common source of Legionella in commercial buildings is from poorly placed or maintained evaporative cooling towers, which often release water in an aerosol which may enter nearby ventilation intakes. Outbreaks in medical facilities and nursing homes, where patients are immuno-suppressed and immuno-weak, are the most commonly reported cases of Legionellosis. More than one case has involved outdoor fountains at public attractions. The presence of Legionella in commercial building water supplies is highly underreported, as healthy people require heavy exposure to acquire infection.

Legionella testing typically involves collecting water samples and surface swabs from evaporative cooling basins, shower heads, faucets/taps, and other locations where warm water collects. The samples are then cultured and colony forming units (cfu) of Legionella are quantified as cfu/liter.

Legionella is a parasite of protozoans such as amoeba, and thus requires conditions suitable for both organisms. The bacterium forms a biofilm which is resistant to chemical and antimicrobial treatments, including chlorine. Remediation for Legionella outbreaks in commercial buildings vary, but often include hot water flushes (160 °F (71 °C)), sterilisation of standing water in evaporative cooling basins, replacement of shower heads, and, in some cases, flushes of heavy metal salts. Preventive measures include adjusting normal hot water levels to allow for 120 °F (49 °C) at the tap, evaluating facility design layout, removing faucet aerators, and periodic testing in suspect areas.

==== Other bacteria ====
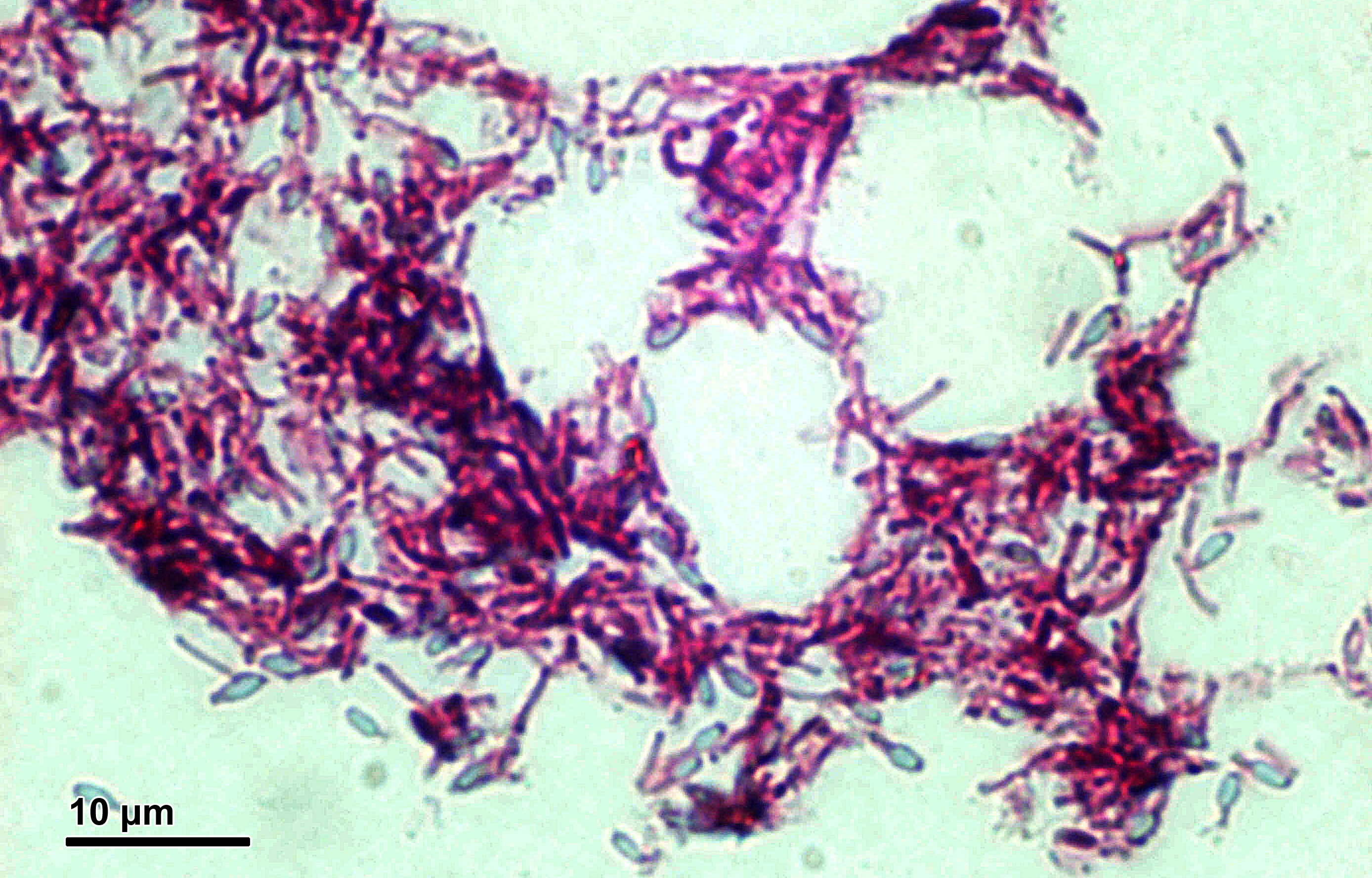
Airborne bacteria

There are many bacteria of health significance found in indoor air and on indoor surfaces. The role of microbes in the indoor environment is increasingly studied using modern gene-based analysis of environmental samples. Currently, efforts are under way to link microbial ecologists and indoor air scientists to forge new methods for analysis and to better interpret the results.

A large fraction of the bacteria found in indoor air and dust are shed from humans. Among the most important bacteria known to occur in indoor air are Mycobacterium tuberculosis, Staphylococcus aureus, Streptococcus pneumoniae.

==== Virus ====
Ninth floor layout of the Metropole Hotel in Hong Kong, showing where an outbreak of the severe acute respiratory syndrome (SARS) occurred

Viruses can also be a concern for indoor air quality. During the 2002–2004 SARS outbreak, virus-laden aerosols were found to have seeped into bathrooms from the bathroom floor drains, exacerbated by the draw of bathroom exhaust fans, resulting in the rapid spread of SARS in Amoy Gardens in Hong Kong. Elsewhere in Hong Kong, SARS CoV RNA was found on the carpet and in the air intake vents of the Metropole Hotel, which showed that secondary environmental contamination could generate infectious aerosols and resulted in superspreading events.

=== Carbon dioxide ===
Humans are the main indoor source of carbon dioxide (CO_{2}) in most occupied buildings. Indoor CO_{2} concentrations can be used as an indicator of the adequacy of outdoor air ventilation relative to occupancy and metabolic activity.

Exposure to elevated indoor CO_{2} concentrations has been investigated in relation to human health and cognitive performance. Some studies have reported physiological and psychomotor effects at relatively low concentrations, although the evidence is not consistent and it can be difficult to distinguish the effects of CO_{2} itself from those of other pollutants and human bioeffluents associated with inadequate ventilation. Reviews of the available evidence have reported possible effects on cognitive performance at concentrations above 1000 ppm, particularly during complex tasks, although the evidence remains subject to uncertainty. At concentrations below 5000 ppm, the health effects attributable specifically to CO_{2} are difficult to distinguish from those associated with other indoor pollutants and inadequate ventilation.

Indoor CO_{2} concentrations are widely used as an indicator of ventilation performance in buildings. Because indoor concentrations are influenced by occupancy, ventilation rates, building characteristics and outdoor conditions, measurements of CO_{2} can provide information on the adequacy of air exchange in occupied spaces. Harmonized analyses of measurements from residential buildings have shown substantial variation in indoor CO_{2} concentrations according to ventilation type and other building and environmental characteristics.

Guidelines and standards use CO_{2} concentrations as an indicator of indoor air quality and ventilation. The National Institute for Occupational Safety and Health (NIOSH) considers concentrations above 1000 ppm to be a marker suggesting inadequate ventilation. Guidance for schools in the United Kingdom has used concentrations of 800 ppm or lower as an indicator of good ventilation. Thresholds used to characterize indoor air quality vary among standards and guidance documents.

In occupied, poorly ventilated spaces, CO_{2} concentrations can rise substantially above outdoor levels within a relatively short period. The rate of increase depends on factors such as room volume, occupancy and ventilation. Measurements in enclosed office spaces have shown that concentrations can rise from approximately 500 ppm to above 1000 ppm within tens of minutes after ventilation is stopped.

=== Radon ===
Radon is an invisible, radioactive atomic gas that results from the radioactive decay of radium, which may be found in rock formations beneath buildings or in certain building materials themselves.

Radon is probably the most pervasive serious hazard for indoor air in the United States and Europe. It is a major cause of lung cancer, responsible for 3–14% of cases in countries, leading to tens of thousands of deaths.

Radon gas enters buildings as a soil gas. As it is a heavy gas it will tend to accumulate at the lowest level. Radon may also be introduced into a building through drinking water particularly from bathroom showers. Building materials can be a rare source of radon, but little testing is carried out for stone, rock or tile products brought into building sites; radon accumulation is greatest for well insulated homes. There are simple do-it-yourself kits for radon gas testing, but a licensed professional can also check homes.

The half-life for radon is 3.8 days, indicating that once the source is removed, the hazard will be greatly reduced within a few weeks. Radon mitigation methods include sealing concrete slab floors, basement foundations, water drainage systems, or by increasing ventilation. They are usually cost effective and can greatly reduce or even eliminate the contamination and the associated health risks.

Radon is measured in picocuries per liter of air (pCi/L) or becquerel per cubic meter (Bq m^{-3)}. Both are measurements of radioactivity. The World Health Organization (WHO) sets the ideal indoor radon levels at 100 Bq/m-^{3}. In the United States, it is recommend to fix homes with radon levels at or above 4 pCi/L. At the same time it is also recommends that people think about fixing their homes for radon levels between 2 pCi/L and 4 pCi/L. In the United Kingdom the ideal is presence of radon indoors is 100 Bq/m-^{3}. Action needs to be taken in homes with 200 Bq/m^{−3} or more.

Interactive maps of radon affected areas are available for various regions and countries of the world.

== IAQ and climate change ==
Indoor air quality is linked inextricably to outdoor air quality. The Intergovernmental Panel on Climate Change (IPCC) has varying scenarios that predict how the climate will change in the future. Climate change can affect indoor air quality by increasing the level of outdoor air pollutants such as ozone and particulate matter, for example through emissions from wildfires caused by extreme heat and drought. Numerous predictions for how indoor air pollutants will change have been made, and models have attempted to predict how the forecasted IPCC scenarios will vary indoor air quality and indoor comfort parameters such as humidity and temperature.

The net-zero challenge requires significant changes in the performance of both new and retrofitted buildings. However, increased energy efficient housing will trap pollutants inside, whether produced indoors or outdoors, and lead to an increase in human exposure.

== Indoor air quality standards and monitoring ==
=== Quality guidelines and standards ===
For occupational exposure, there are standards, which cover a wide range of chemicals, and applied to healthy adults who are exposed over time at workplaces (usually industrial environments).These are published by organizations such as Occupational Safety and Health Administration (OSHA), the National Institute for Occupational Safety and Health (NIOSH), the UK Health and Safety Executive (HSE).

There is no consensus globally about indoor air quality standards, or health-based guidelines. However, there are regulations from some individual countries and from health organizations. For example, the World Health Organization (WHO) has published health-based global air quality guidelines for the general population that are applicable both to outdoor and indoor air, as well as the WHO IAQ guidelines for selected compounds, whereas the UK Health Security Agency published IAQ guidelines for selected VOCs. The Scientific and Technical Committee (STC34) of the International Society of Indoor Air Quality and Climate (ISIAQ) created an open database that collects indoor environmental quality guidelines worldwide. The database is focused on indoor air quality (IAQ), but is currently extended to include standards, regulations, and guidelines related to ventilation, comfort, acoustics, and lighting.

=== Real-time monitoring ===
Since indoor air pollutants can adversely affect human health, it is important to have real-time indoor air quality assessment/monitoring system that can help not only in the improvement of indoor air quality but also help in detection of leaks and spills in a work environment. It can also boost energy efficiency of buildings by providing real-time feedback to the heating, ventilation, and air conditioning (HVAC) system(s). Additionally, there have been enough studies that highlight the correlation between poor indoor air quality and loss of performance and productivity of workers in an office setting.

Combining Internet of Things (IoT) technology with real-time IAQ monitoring systems has gained popularity as interventions can be done based on the real-time sensor data, assissting in IAQ improvement.

== Improvement measures ==
Indoor air quality can be addressed, achieved or maintained during the design of new buildings or as mitigating measures in existing buildings. A hierarchy of measures has been proposed by the Institute of Air Quality Management. It emphasizes removing pollutant sources, reducing emissions from any remaining sources, disrupting pathways between sources and the people exposed, protecting people from exposure to pollutants, and removing people from areas with poor air quality.

A report assisted by the Institute for Occupational Safety and Health of the German Social Accident Insurance can support in the systematic investigation of individual health problems arising at indoor workplaces, and in the identification of practical solutions.

=== HVAC design ===
Environmentally sustainable design concepts include aspects of commercial and residential heating, ventilation and air-conditioning (HVAC) technologies. Among several considerations, one of the topics attended to is the issue of indoor air quality throughout the design and construction stages of a building's life.

One technique to reduce energy consumption while maintaining adequate air quality, is demand-controlled ventilation. Instead of setting throughput at a fixed air replacement rate, carbon dioxide sensors are used to control the rate dynamically, based on the emissions of actual building occupants.

One way of quantitatively ensuring the health of indoor air is by the frequency of effective turnover of interior air by replacement with outside air. In the UK, for example, classrooms are required to have 2.5 outdoor air changes per hour. In halls, gym, dining, and physiotherapy spaces, the ventilation should be sufficient to limit carbon dioxide to 1,500 ppm. In the US, ventilation in classrooms is based on the amount of outdoor air per occupant plus the amount of outdoor air per unit of floor area, not air changes per hour. Since carbon dioxide indoors comes from occupants and outdoor air, the adequacy of ventilation per occupant is indicated by the concentration indoors minus the concentration outdoors. The value of 615 ppm above the outdoor concentration indicates approximately 15 cubic feet per minute of outdoor air per adult occupant doing sedentary office work where outdoor air contains over 400 ppm (global average as of 2023). In classrooms, the requirements in the ASHRAE standard 62.1, Ventilation for Acceptable Indoor Air Quality, would typically result in about 3 air changes per hour, depending on the occupant density. As the occupants are not the only source of pollutants, outdoor air ventilation may need to be higher when unusual or strong sources of pollution exist indoors.

ASHRAE Standard 62.1 also provides the Indoor Air Quality Procedure (IAQP), a performance-based alternative to the Ventilation Rate Procedure. Under the IAQP, outdoor airflow and other system design parameters are determined based on factors including contaminant sources, concentration limits, air cleaning, and perceived indoor air acceptability.

When outdoor air is polluted, bringing in more outdoor air can actually worsen the overall quality of the indoor air and exacerbate some occupant symptoms related to outdoor air pollution. Generally, outdoor country air is better than indoor city air.

The use of air filters can trap some of the air pollutants. Portable room air cleaners with HEPA filters can be used if ventilation is poor or outside air has high level of PM 2.5. Air filters are used to reduce the amount of dust that reaches the wet coils. Dust can serve as food to grow molds on the wet coils and ducts and can reduce the efficiency of the coils.

The use of trickle vents on windows is also valuable to maintain constant ventilation. They can help prevent mold and allergen build up in the home or workplace. They can also reduce the spread of some respiratory infections.

Moisture management and humidity control requires operating HVAC systems as designed. Moisture management and humidity control may conflict with efforts to conserve energy. For example, moisture management and humidity control requires systems to be set to supply make-up air at lower temperatures (design levels), instead of the higher temperatures sometimes used to conserve energy in cooling-dominated climate conditions. However, for most of the US and many parts of Europe and Japan, during the majority of hours of the year, outdoor air temperatures are cool enough that the air does not need further cooling to provide thermal comfort indoors. However, high humidity outdoors creates the need for careful attention to humidity levels indoors. High humidity give rise to mold growth and moisture indoors is associated with a higher prevalence of occupant respiratory problems.

The "dew point temperature" is an absolute measure of the moisture in air. Some facilities are being designed with dew points in the lower 50s °F, and some in the upper and lower 40s °F. Some facilities are being designed using desiccant wheels with gas-fired heaters to dry out the wheel enough to get the required dew points. On those systems, after the moisture is removed from the make-up air, a cooling coil is used to lower the temperature to the desired level.

Commercial buildings, and sometimes residential, are often kept under slightly positive air pressure relative to the outdoors to reduce infiltration. Limiting infiltration helps with moisture management and humidity control.

Dilution of indoor pollutants with outdoor air is effective to the extent that outdoor air is free of harmful pollutants. Ozone in outdoor air occurs indoors at reduced concentrations because ozone is highly reactive with many chemicals found indoors. The products of the reactions between ozone and many common indoor pollutants include organic compounds that may be more odorous, irritating, or toxic than those from which they are formed. These products of ozone chemistry include formaldehyde, higher molecular weight aldehydes, acidic aerosols, and fine and ultrafine particles, among others. The higher the outdoor ventilation rate, the higher the indoor ozone concentration and the more likely the reactions will occur, but even at low levels, the reactions will take place. This suggests that ozone should be removed from ventilation air, especially in areas where outdoor ozone levels are frequently high.

=== Effect of indoor plants ===
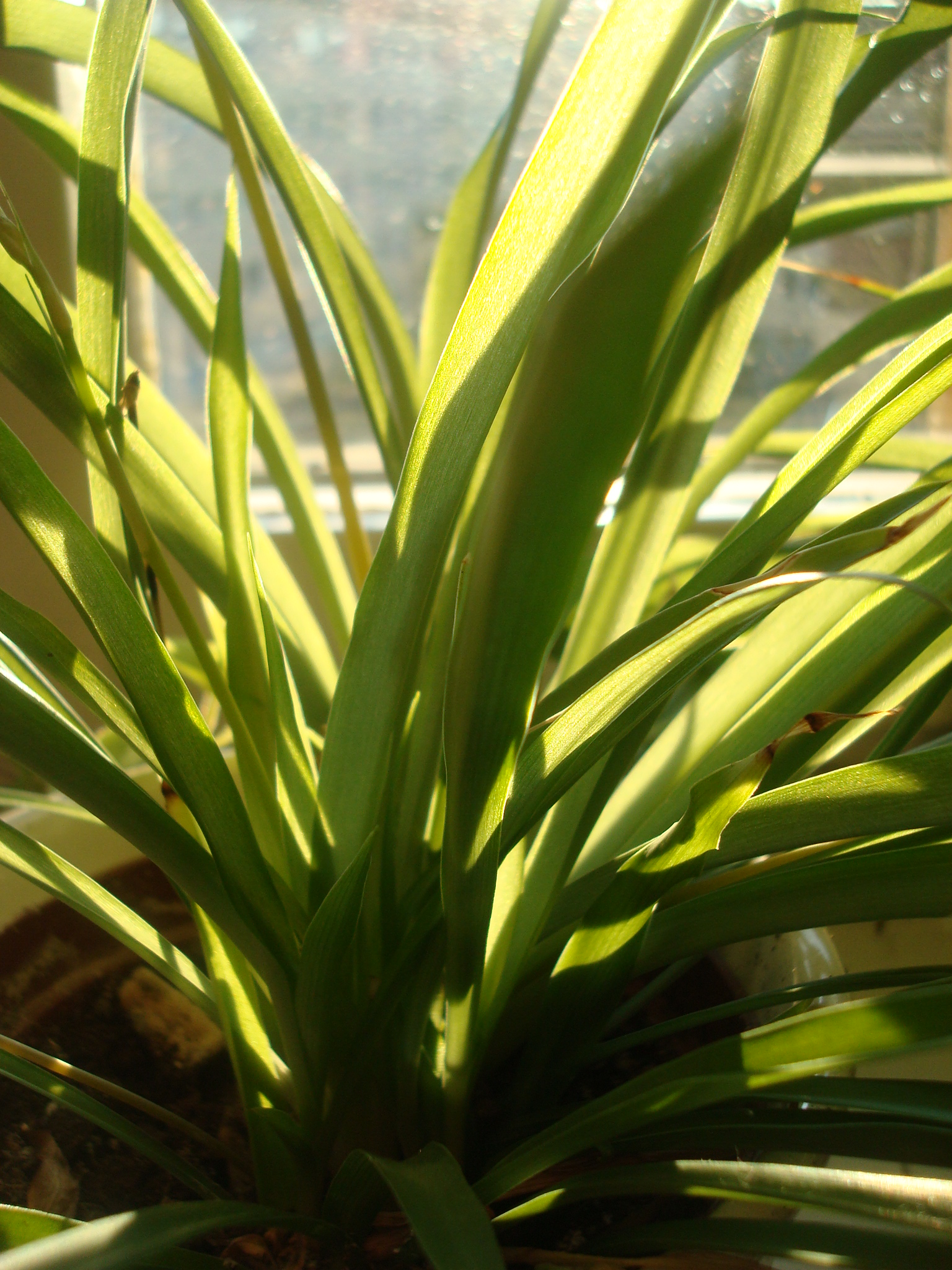
Spider plants (Chlorophytum comosum) absorb some airborne contaminants.

Houseplants together with the medium in which they are grown can reduce components of indoor air pollution, particularly volatile organic compounds (VOC) such as benzene, toluene, and xylene. Plants remove CO_{2} and release oxygen and water, although the quantitative impact for house plants is small. The interest in using potted plants for removing VOCs was sparked by a 1989 NASA study conducted in sealed chambers designed to replicate the environment on space stations. However, these results suffered from poor replication and are not applicable to typical buildings, where outdoor-to-indoor air exchange already removes VOCs at a rate that could only be matched by the placement of 10–1000 plants/m^{2} of a building's floor space.

Plants also appear to reduce airborne microbes and molds, and to increase humidity. However, the increased humidity can itself lead to increased levels of mold and even VOCs.

Since extremely high humidity is associated with increased mold growth, allergic responses, and respiratory responses, the presence of additional moisture from houseplants may not be desirable in all indoor settings if watering is done inappropriately.

== Institutional programs ==
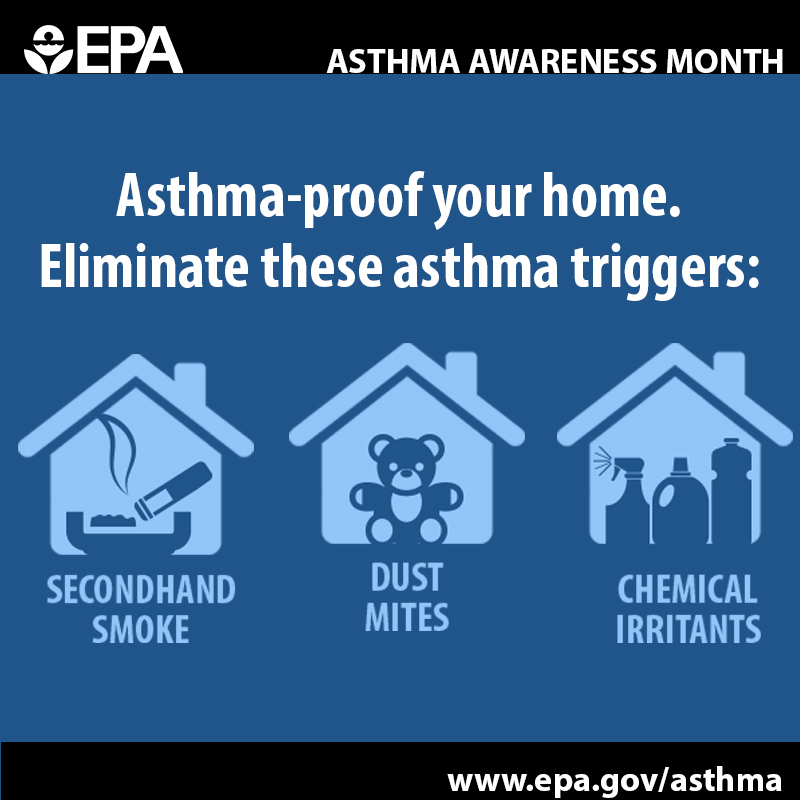
EPA graphic about asthma triggers

The topic of IAQ has become popular due to the greater awareness of health problems caused by mold and triggers to asthma and allergies.

In the US, the Environmental Protection Agency (EPA) has developed an "IAQ Tools for Schools" program to help improve the indoor environmental conditions in educational institutions. The National Institute for Occupational Safety and Health conducts Health Hazard Evaluations (HHEs) in workplaces at the request of employees, authorized representative of employees, or employers, to determine whether any substance normally found in the place of employment has potentially toxic effects, including indoor air quality.

A variety of scientists work in the field of indoor air quality, including chemists, physicists, mechanical engineers, biologists, bacteriologists, epidemiologists, and computer scientists. Some of these professionals are certified by organizations such as the American Industrial Hygiene Association, the American Indoor Air Quality Council and the Indoor Environmental Air Quality Council.

In the UK, under the Department for Environment Food and Rural Affairs, the Air Quality Expert Group considers current knowledge on indoor air quality and provides advice to government and devolved administration ministers.

At the international level, the International Society of Indoor Air Quality and Climate (ISIAQ), formed in 1991, organizes two major conferences, the Indoor Air and the Healthy Buildings series.

== See also ==
- Environmental management
- Healthy building
- Indoor bioaerosol
- Microbiomes of the built environment
- Olfactory fatigue
