= C6H8N2O3 =

The molecular formula C_{6}H_{8}N_{2}O_{3} (molar mass: 156.141 g/mol) may refer to:

- Imidazol-4-one-5-propionic acid
- 1,3-Dimethylbarbituric acid
