= StoveTeam International =

Non-profit organization

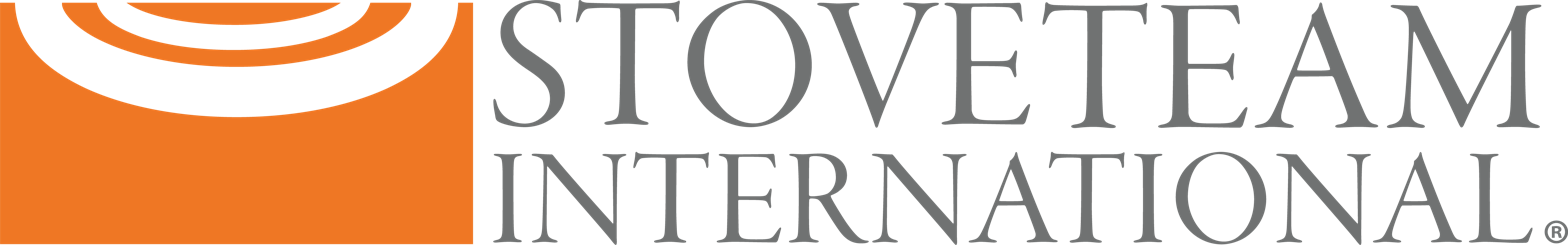
- Founded: 2008; 18 years ago
- Founder: Nancy Sanford Hughes
- Type: Non-governmental organization
- Location: Eugene, Oregon, U.S.
- Region served: Latin America
- Staff: 4
- Website: stoveteam.org

StoveTeam International is a non-profit organization founded in 2008 that provides improved cook stoves to people in developing nations in Latin America. According to the organization, it has been responsible for the distribution of over 76,300 stoves to date.

== History ==
Founder Nancy Sanford Hughes witnessed the health effects of open-fire cooking firsthand while volunteering with medical missions in Guatemala. In response, Hughes gathered support from her local Rotary club and contacted experts in the field of improved cook stoves to design the Ecocina, a stove specifically designed to be produced and used in Latin America. For her work with StoveTeam, Hughes has been honored as a United States White House Champion of Change, and a CNN Hero.

== Operations ==
StoveTeam assists local entrepreneurs in Latin America to start their own projects to build and distribute Ecocina and Justa cook stoves. StoveTeam has started projects in Honduras, El Salvador, Nicaragua, and Guatemala.
