= Methylfuran =

Methylfuran may refer to:

- 2-Methylfuran
- 3-Methylfuran
