= Indoor Air Quality Procedure =

Performance-based ventilation design procedure

The Indoor Air Quality Procedure (IAQP) is one of the procedures for ventilation design prescribed in ASHRAE Standard 62.1, Ventilation and Acceptable Indoor Air Quality. The IAQP is a performance-based methodology that uses mass balance calculations for determining the outdoor airflow rate.

Calculations must consider indoor and outdoor sources, air cleaning, and other variables. The IAQP is an alternative to the Ventilation Rate Procedure (VRP), which provides a prescriptive approach to determining the outdoor airflow rate based on space type/application, occupancy level, and floor area.

== History ==
The IAQP was first introduced in ASHRAE Standard 62-1981, along with the VRP. Researchers have identified practical challenges in implementing the procedure, such as the selection of contaminants, concentration limits, and information about contaminant sources. The IAQP is used less commonly than the VRP.

ASHRAE published improvements to the IAQP in Addendum aa to Standard 62.1-2019, which was released in 2022. The addendum established requirements for designing to specific limits for design compounds and particulate matter. It identified specific design compounds and mixtures, and it included objective and subjective testing.

== Methodology ==
To apply the IAQP, designers must identify building contaminants, their sources (indoor and outdoor), source emission rates, applicable concentration limits and exposure periods. Then, designers use mass balance calculations to establish requirements for air cleaning and ventilation. Designers must document the approach used to determine these requirements, along with all of the factors considered.

They can include air cleaning based on its effectiveness in addressing the contaminants they evaluated.

If designers are designing a building under the revised IAQP, they must measure the design compounds and particulate matter to verify that they met design limits. The IAQP also requires a post-construction subjective survey to verify that building occupants are satisfied with the indoor air quality.

== Research and energy implications ==
In an evaluation of 13 retail stores using the IAQP, Lawrence Berkeley National Laboratory researchers found that, in two of the buildings, applying the IAQP to allow lower ventilation rates could reduce energy consumption while still maintaining acceptable indoor air quality.

In the remaining 11 stores, saving energy through lower ventilation rates would require additional strategies, such as reducing indoor sources of contaminants of concern or using gas-phase air cleaning technologies.

The study found that the IAQP doesn't necessarily lead to lower ventilation rates. Even though reducing outdoor airflow can reduce the energy required to condition incoming air, the potential energy impact depends on contaminant sources, outdoor concentrations, and the use of source control or air cleaning.

== See also ==
- ASHRAE
- Indoor air quality
- Ventilation (architecture)
- Air filter
- Heating, ventilation, and air conditioning
