= Comparison of psychoactive alcohols in alcoholic drinks =

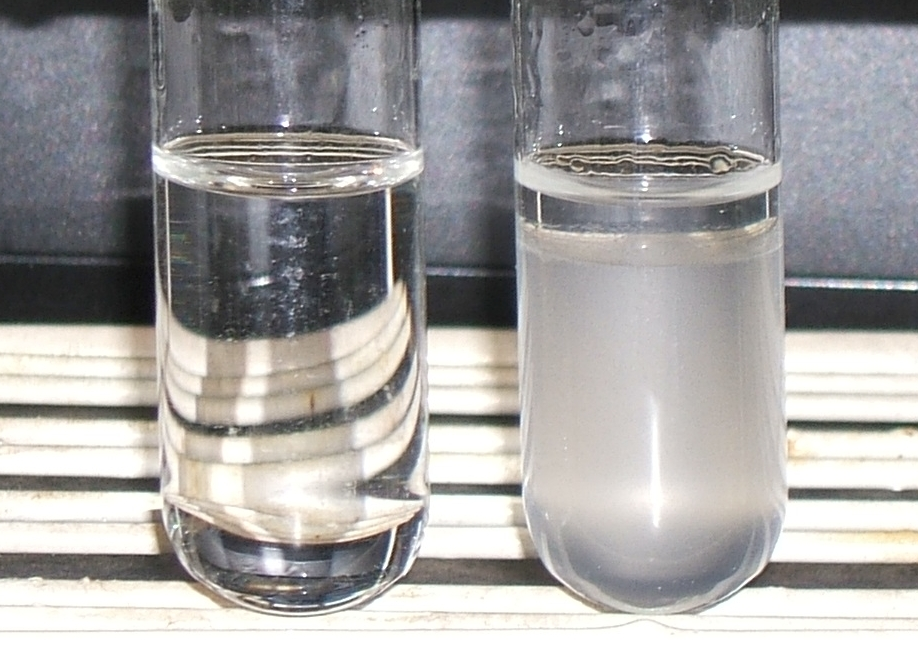
Photo: negative (left) with ethanol and positive with t-butanol.

Comparison of psychoactive alcohols in alcoholic beverages.

The Lucas test in alcohols is a test to differentiate between primary, secondary, and tertiary alcohols.

== General ==
IUPAC name	Common name	Classification	CAS
Ethanol	Alcohol, drinking alcohol, ethyl alcohol, EtOH	Primary	64-17-5
Propan-1-ol	1-Propanol, 1-propyl alcohol, PrOH	Primary	71-23-8
2-(1H-Indol-3-yl)ethanol	Tryptophol	Primary	526-55-6
2-Methylbutan-1-ol	2-Methyl-1-butanol (2M1B)	Secondary	137-32-6
2-methylpropan-1-ol	2-Methyl-1-propanol (2M1P), Isobutanol	Primary	78-83-1
2-Methylbutan-2-ol	2-Methyl-2-butanol (2M2B), tert-Amyl alcohol (TAA, tert-amylol)	Tertiary	75-85-4
2-Methylpropan-2-ol	2-Methyl-2-propanol (2M2P), tert-Butyl alcohol ((TBA), tert-butanol), t-BuOH	Tertiary	75-65-0
2-Phenylethan-1-ol	Phenethyl alcohol, 2-Phenylethanol	Primary	60-12-8
3-Methylbutan-1-ol	3-methyl-1-butanol (3M1B), isoamyl alcohol, isopentyl alcohol (isopentanol)	Primary	123-51-3

== Pharmacology ==
IUPAC name	IARC carcinogen group	Toxic metabolite(s)	Alcohol by volume (ABV)	LD50 in rat, oral
Ethanol	Group 1	Acetaldehyde → acetic acid	Up to 95.6% in rectified spirit	7060 mg/kg
Propan-1-ol		Propionaldehyde → propionic acid	2.8% (mean) in Jamaican rum: 2384–3130 mg/100 mL. Up to 3500 mg/L (0.35%) in spirits.	1870 mg/kg
2-(1H-Indol-3-yl)ethanol		?	?	?
2-Methylbutan-1-ol		?	1.2% (mean) in Bourbon: 910–1390 mg/100 mL	4170 mg/kg
2-methylpropan-1-ol		?	0.9% (mean) in Rye mash cistern room: 534–1197 mg/100 mL	2460 mg/kg
2-Methylbutan-2-ol		None (tertiary alcohol)	0.07% in beer: 70 mg/100 mL (see tert-Pentyl alcohol in ref) Found in cassava fermented drinks	1000 mg/kg
2-Methylpropan-2-ol		None (tertiary alcohol)	Identified, not quantified, in beer	2743 mg/kg
2-Phenylethan-1-ol		?	0.1% in non-yeasted cider (Kieser 1964): 100 mg/100 mL	1790 mg/kg
3-Methylbutan-1-ol		?	1.5% (mean) in French Brandy: 859–2108 mg/100 mL	1300 mg/kg

=== Difference from ethanol ===
IUPAC name	% intoxication by alcoholic drink (ABV x potency compared to EtOH / total ABV)	Therapeutic index (Potency compared to EtOH/EtOH LD50:LD50 ratio)	Potency compared to EtOH	EtOH LD50:LD50 ratio
Ethanol	-	-	-	-
Propan-1-ol	21%: 2,8×3÷40	0.8 (mean): 0.5-1.1	3 (mean): 2-4	3.8
2-(1H-Indol-3-yl)ethanol	?	?	?	?
2-Methylbutan-1-ol	?	?	?	1.7
2-methylpropan-1-ol	?	?	?	?
2-Methylbutan-2-ol	28%: 0.07×20÷5	2.8	20	7.1
2-Methylpropan-2-ol	?	?	?	2.6
2-Phenylethan-1-ol	?	?	?	?
3-Methylbutan-1-ol	?	?	?	5.4

== Characteristic ==
IUPAC name	Color/Form	Odor	Taste
Ethanol	Clear, colorless, very mobile liquid	Mild, rather pleasant; like wine or whiskey. Weak, ethereal, vinous odor.	Burning, slightly sweet
Propan-1-ol	Colorless liquid	Similar to ethanol	Characteristic ripe, fruity flavor. Burning taste
2-(1H-Indol-3-yl)ethanol	?	?	?
2-Methylbutan-1-ol	Oily, clear liquid. Colorless liquid	Characteristic, disagreeable odor.	Pungent, repulsive taste
2-methylpropan-1-ol	Colorless, oily liquid. Clear, colorless, refractive, mobile liquid.	Suffocating odor of fusel oil. Slightly suffocating; nonresidual alcoholic. Sweet, musty odor	Sweet whiskey taste
2-Methylbutan-2-ol	Colorless liquid	Characteristic odor. Camphor odor	Burning taste
2-Methylpropan-2-ol	Colorless liquid or solid (crystals) (above 78 degrees F)	Camphor-like odor	?
2-Phenylethan-1-ol	?	Intense odour of roses	Burning
3-Methylbutan-1-ol	Oily, clear liquid. Colorless liquid.	Characteristic, disagreeable odor.	Pungent, repulsive taste
