= Fusel alcohol =

Alcoholic fermentation byproduct

Fusel alcohols or fuselol, also sometimes called fusel oils in Europe, are mixtures of several higher alcohols (those with more than two carbons, chiefly amyl alcohol) produced as a by-product of alcoholic fermentation. The word Fusel [ˈfuːzl̩] is German for "bad liquor".

Whether fusel alcohol contributes to hangover symptoms is a matter of scientific debate. A Japanese study in 2003 concluded that "the fusel oil in whisky had no effect on the ethanol-induced emetic response" in the Asian house shrew. Additionally, consumption of fusel oils with ethanol suppressed subjects' subsequent taste aversion to alcohol, which suggested subjects' hangover symptoms were lessened, according to the journal.

== Usage ==
Fusel oil and fusel-oil acetates are used in the lacquer industry as high boiling point solvents. The term, fusel, is the German equivalent of the English words "rotgut" or "hooch".

== Compounds ==
Excessive concentrations of some alcohols other than ethanol may cause off-flavors, sometimes described as "spicy", "hot", or "solvent-like". Some beverages, such as rum, whisky (especially bourbon), incompletely rectified vodka (e.g. siwucha) and traditional ales and ciders, are expected to have relatively high concentrations of non-hazardous alcohols as part of their flavor profile. However, in other beverages, such as Korn, vodka and lagers, the presence of alcohols other than ethanol is considered a fault.

The compounds involved are chiefly the following:

- isoamyl alcohol (isopentanol)
- 2-methyl-1-butanol - sometimes called "active" amyl alcohol
- isobutyl alcohol - one of the least toxic of the butanols.
- 1-propanol

Other higher alcohols that can be produced during fermentation include:

- isopropanol (isopropyl alcohol), oxidized to form acetone by alcohol dehydrogenase in the liver, leading to ketosis when ingested in large quantities.
- 1-butanol
- 1-pentanol (n-amyl alcohol)
- 1-hexanol
- 2-phenylethanol
- tyrosol
- tryptophol
- methionol

== Distillation ==
During distillation, fusel alcohols are concentrated in the feints or "tails" at the end of the distillation run. They have an oily consistency, which is noticeable to the distiller, hence the other name "fusel oil". If desired, these heavier alcohols can be almost completely separated in a reflux still. On the other hand, freeze distillation does not remove fusel alcohols.

Fusel alcohols can be reduced during fermentation by lowering the fermenter's temperature or increasing the oxygen content.

== See also ==
- Alcohol (drug)
- Beer purity law (1516)
- Biofuel
- Cellulosic ethanol
- Moonshine
- Sorghum beer
- Wine chemistry
