= Trickle vent =

Small opening for ventilation

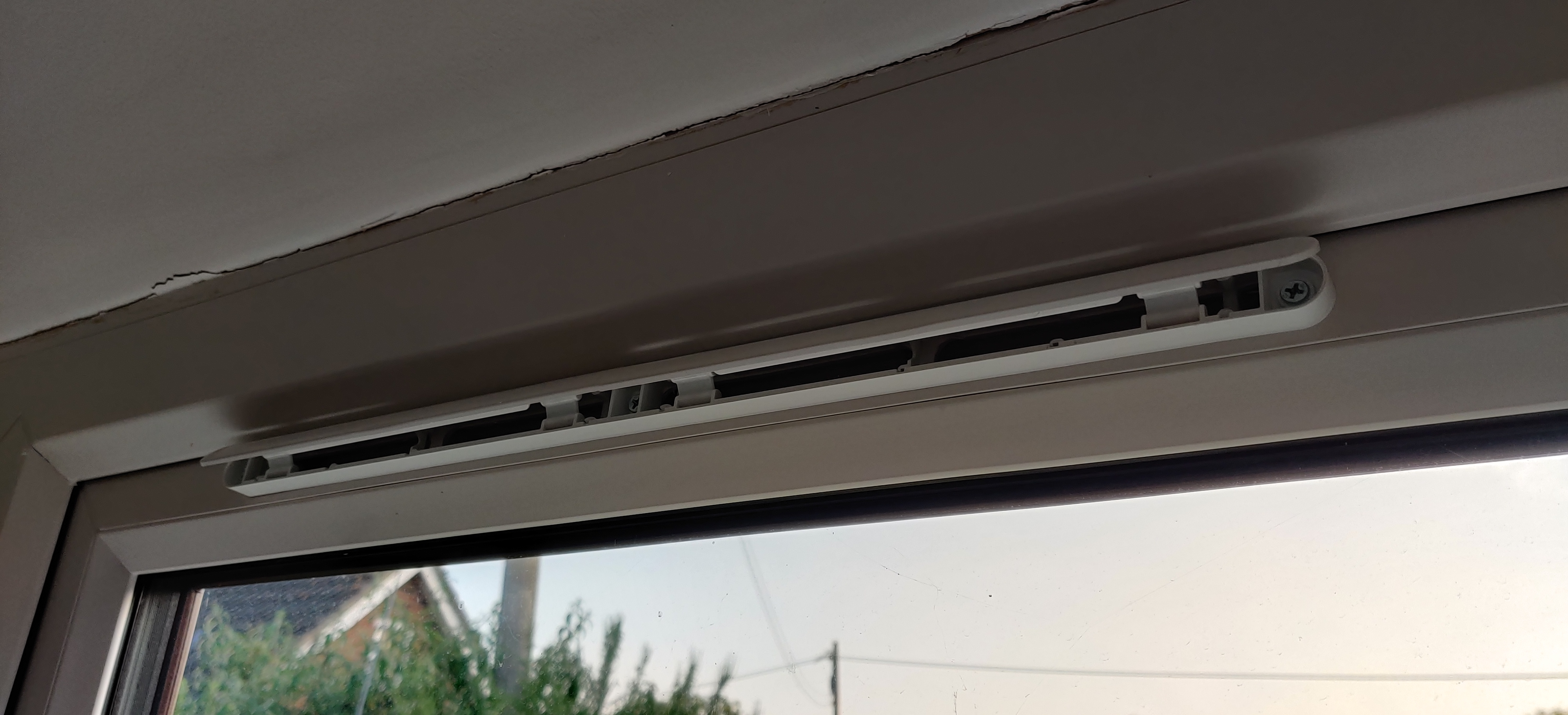
Open Trickle Vent built into a window frame

A trickle vent is a relatively small opening in a window or other building envelope component to allow small amounts of ventilation in spaces intended to be naturally ventilated when major elements of the design—windows, doors, etc.—are otherwise closed. Trickle vents are used extensively in Europe and are integrated into window frames to provide minimum ventilation requirements for naturally-ventilated spaces.

== Energy efficiency ratings ==
The application of trickle vents in naturally-ventilated spaces can help contribute to IEQ Credit 2 under the LEED green building rating system. LEED EA Credit 2 references CIBSE Applications Manual 10, which provides advice on the design of naturally-ventilated spaces, recommending the installation of trickle vents in naturally-ventilated spaces. Within the UK, the application of trickle vents is required to meet the requirements of the Building Regulations; requirements are described in Guide F, Means of Ventilation.

== Effect on indoor environment ==
Trickle vents will help avoid problems associated with poor ventilation in naturally-ventilated spaces, including reduced risk of condensation, avoided over-ventilation (minimizing energy consumption), and improved comfort through draft avoidance.
