= Nancy Sanford Hughes =

American non-profit executive

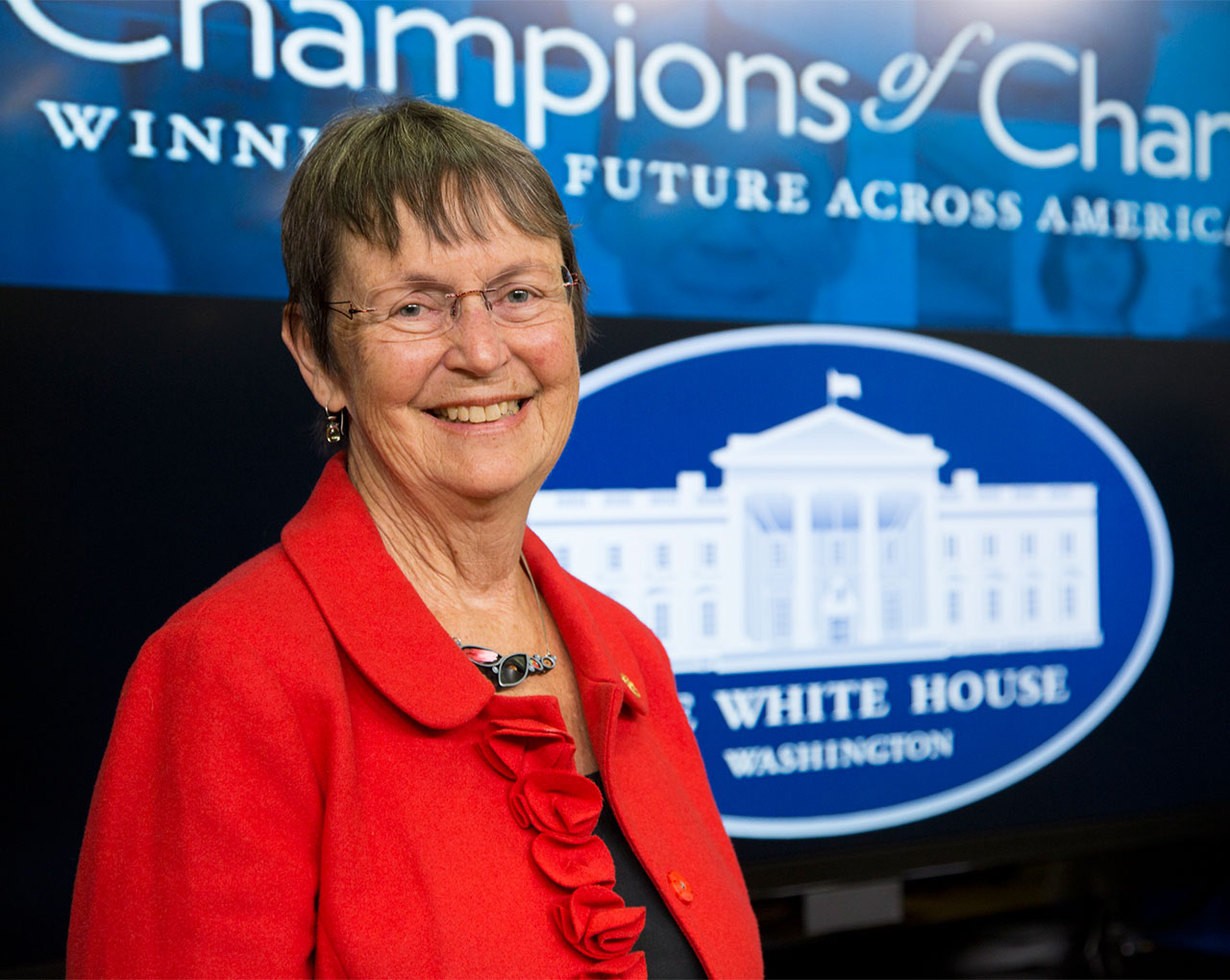
- Hughes in 2013
- Born: January 8, 1943 (age 83); Claremont, California, United States
- Education: Whitman College
- Known for: StoveTeam International
- Website: www.stoveteam.org

Nancy Sanford Hughes (born January 8, 1943) is the founder and president of the non-profit StoveTeam International. For her work bringing improved cookstoves to Latin America, Hughes has been honored as a United States White House Champion of Change, and a CNN Hero.

== Early life ==
Hughes was born in Claremont, California and graduated from Whitman College in 1964 with a Bachelor of Arts in English Literature. She married George "Duffy" Hughes in 1971, with whom she has three children.

== StoveTeam International ==
While volunteering with medical missions in Guatemala, Hughes saw the health effects of open-fire cooking firsthand. In response, Hughes contacted experts in the field of improved cook stoves to design a stove for Latin America and founded StoveTeam International in 2008. The charity is a non-profit organization that works to bring improved cook stoves to people in Latin America through its use of public donations, which directly fund the development of stove-building factories, owned and operated by local entrepreneurs.
