= 2-Pentanol =

Names
- Preferred IUPAC name Pentan-2-ol
- Other names 2-Pentanol sec-amyl alcohol

Identifiers
CAS Number	6032-29-7; 31087-44-2 (R); 26184-62-3 (S)
3D model (JSmol)	Interactive image; (R): Interactive image; (S): Interactive image
Abbreviations	s-PeOH sPeOH^{s}PeOH s-AmOH sAmOH^{s}AmOH
ChEBI	CHEBI:77518
ChEMBL	ChEMBL45065
ChemSpider	21011
ECHA InfoCard	100.025.370
PubChem CID	22386; 7014876 (R); 2724896 (S)
UNII	04G7050365
CompTox Dashboard (EPA)	DTXSID3052721
- InChI: InChI=1S/C5H12O/c1-3-4-5(2)6/h5-6H,3-4H2,1-2H3 Key: JYVLIDXNZAXMDK-UHFFFAOYSA-N; InChI=1/C5H12O/c1-3-4-5(2)6/h5-6H,3-4H2,1-2H3 Key: JYVLIDXNZAXMDK-UHFFFAOYAY
- SMILES: OC(C)CCC; (R): CCC[C@@H](C)O; (S): CCC[C@H](C)O

Properties
Chemical formula	C_{5}H_{12}O
Molar mass	88.150 g·mol^{−1}
Appearance	Colorless liquid
Density	0.812 g/cm^{3}
Melting point	−73 °C (−99 °F; 200 K)
Boiling point	119.3 °C (246.7 °F; 392.4 K)
Solubility in water	45 g/L
Solubility	soluble in ethanol, diethyl ether, carbon tetrachloride, chloroform
Vapor pressure	0.804 kPa
Magnetic susceptibility (χ)	−69.1·10^{−6} cm^{3}/mol
Viscosity	3.470 mPa·s

Thermochemistry
Heat capacity (C)	2.716 J·g^{−1}·K^{−1} (liquid)
Std enthalpy of formation (Δ_{f}H^{⦵}_{298})	−365.2 kJ·mol^{−1} (liquid) −311.0 kJ·mol^{−1} (gas)

Hazards
Flash point	34 °C (93 °F; 307 K)
Autoignition temperature	343 °C (649 °F; 616 K)
Explosive limits	1.2–9%

Related compounds
Related compounds	Amyl alcohol
- Except where otherwise noted, data are given for materials in their standard state (at 25 °C [77 °F], 100 kPa). verify (what is ?) Infobox references

2-Pentanol (IUPAC name: pentan-2-ol; also called sec-amyl alcohol) is an organic chemical compound. It is used as a solvent and an intermediate in the manufacturing of other chemicals. 2-Pentanol is a component of many mixtures of amyl alcohols sold industrially. 2-Pentanol is chiral and thus can be obtained as either of two stereoisomers designated as (R)-(−)-2-pentanol and (S)-(+)-2-pentanol.

2-Pentanol has been detected in fresh bananas by gas chromatography–mass spectrometry, at an abundance of 14.26±2.63 ppm.

== Reactions ==
2-Pentanol can be manufactured by hydration of pentene.

== See also ==
- sec-Amyl acetate
- 2-Methyl-2-butanol
- 3-Pentanol
- Hedonal
- 1-Octanol
