= Methionol =

Names
- IUPAC name 3-methylsulfanylpropan-1-ol

Identifiers
CAS Number	505-10-2
3D model (JSmol)	Interactive image
Beilstein Reference	1731208
ChEBI	CHEBI:49019
ChEMBL	ChEMBL332887
ChemSpider	10016
ECHA InfoCard	100.007.277
EC Number	208-004-6
PubChem CID	10448
UNII	H1E1U441XX
CompTox Dashboard (EPA)	DTXSID7060128
- InChI: InChI=1S/C4H10OS/c1-6-4-2-3-5/h5H,2-4H2,1H3 Key: CZUGFKJYCPYHHV-UHFFFAOYSA-N
- SMILES: CSCCCO

Properties
Chemical formula	C_{4}H_{10}OS
Molar mass	106.18 g·mol^{−1}

Hazards
- GHS labelling
Pictograms	(GHS07: Exclamation mark)
Signal word	Warning
Hazard statements	H315, H319, H335
Precautionary statements	P261, P264, P264+P265, P271, P280, P302+P352, P304+P340, P305+P351+P338, P319, P321, P332+P317, P337+P317, P362+P364, P403+P233, P405, P501

Related compounds
Related compounds	1-(Methylthio)propane; Methional; Methionine; 1,3-Propanediol mono methyl ether; 4-(Methylsulfanyl)butanoic acid; 4-Thiapentanoic acid;
- Except where otherwise noted, data are given for materials in their standard state (at 25 °C [77 °F], 100 kPa). Infobox references

Methionol (3-(Methylthio)-1-propanol) is a methyl sulfide derived from propan-1-ol. It is found in nature, including as a metabolite of yeast and bacillus anthracis. It is a sulphurous aroma component of many foods, such as wine, cheese and roasted coffee. It is classed as an irritant. It has a very low olfactory threshold.
