= Amyl alcohol =

Chemical compound family

Amyl alcohols are alcohols with the formula C_{5}H_{11}OH. There are eight isomers. A mixture of amyl alcohols (also called amyl alcohol) can be obtained from fusel alcohol. Amyl alcohol is used as a solvent and in esterification, from which amyl acetate and other compounds are produced. The name amyl alcohol without further specification applies to the normal (straight-chain) form, 1-pentanol.

Amyl alcohol isomers
Common name	Structure	Type	IUPAC name	Boiling point (°C)
1-pentanol or normal amyl alcohol		primary	Pentan-1-ol	138.5
2-methyl-1-butanol or active amyl alcohol		primary	2-Methylbutan-1-ol	128.7
3-methyl-1-butanol or isoamyl alcohol or isopentyl alcohol		primary	3-Methylbutan-1-ol	131.2
2,2-dimethyl-1-propanol or neopentyl alcohol		primary	2,2-Dimethylpropan-1-ol	113.1
2-pentanol or sec-amyl alcohol or methyl (n) propyl carbinol		secondary	Pentan-2-ol	118.8
3-methyl-2-butanol or sec-isoamyl alcohol or methyl isopropyl carbinol		secondary	3-Methylbutan-2-ol	113.6
3-Pentanol		secondary	Pentan-3-ol	115.3
2-methyl-2-butanol or tert-amyl alcohol		tertiary	2-Methylbutan-2-ol	102

Three of these alcohols, 2-methyl-1-butanol, 2-pentanol, and 3-methyl-2-butanol (methyl isopropyl carbinol), contain stereocenters, and are therefore chiral and optically active.

The most important amyl alcohol is isoamyl alcohol, the chief one generated by fermentation in the production of alcoholic beverages and a constituent of fusel oil. The other amyl alcohols may be obtained synthetically.
