= 3-Pentanol =

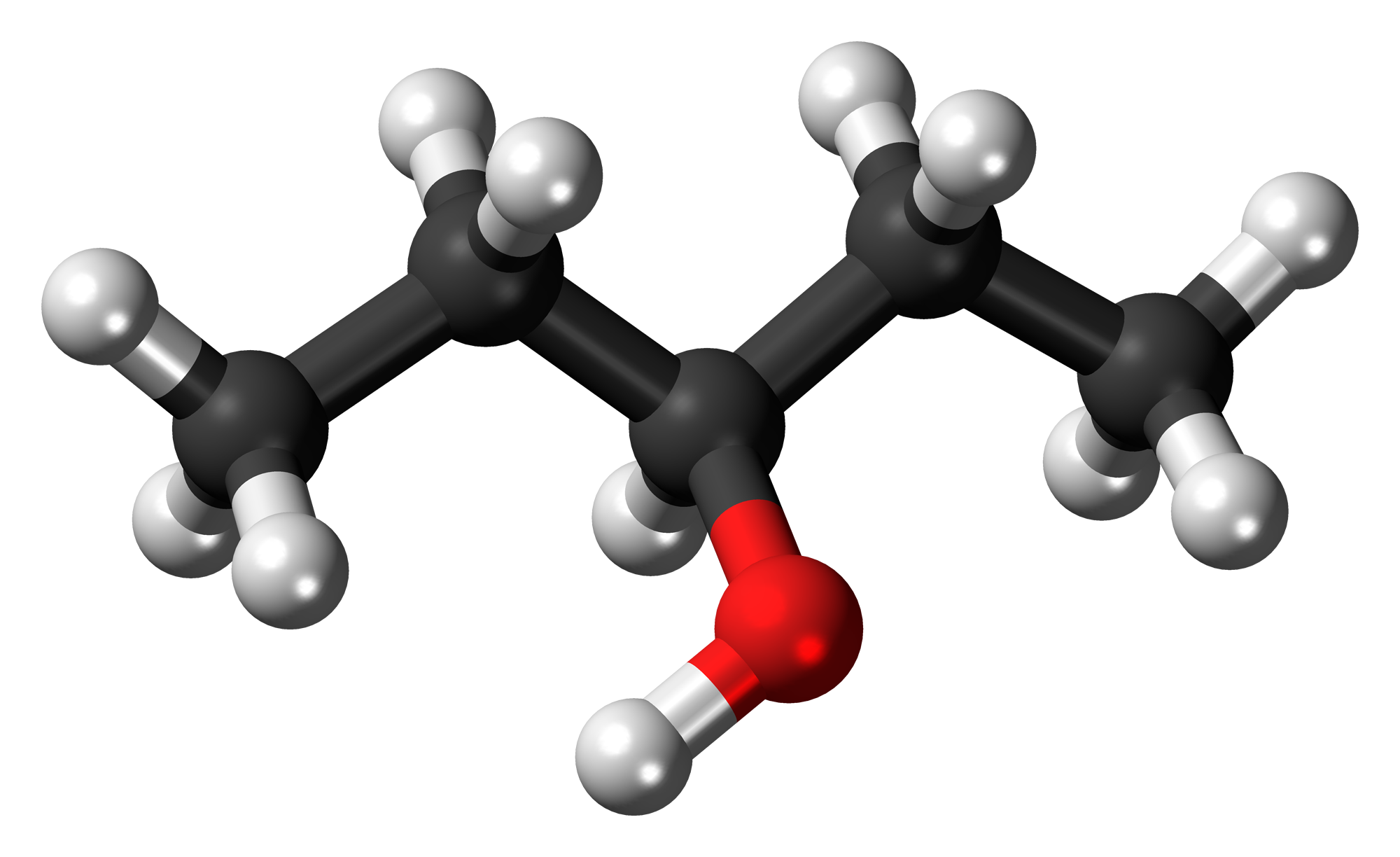

Names
- Preferred IUPAC name Pentan-3-ol
- Other names 3-Pentanol, diethyl carbinol

Identifiers
CAS Number	584-02-1
3D model (JSmol)	Interactive image
ChEBI	CHEBI:77519
ChEMBL	ChEMBL47100
ChemSpider	10947
ECHA InfoCard	100.008.662
PubChem CID	11428
UNII	X4ELC182I5
CompTox Dashboard (EPA)	DTXSID8060400
- InChI: InChI=1S/C5H12O/c1-3-5(6)4-2/h5-6H,3-4H2,1-2H3 Key: AQIXEPGDORPWBJ-UHFFFAOYSA-N; InChI=1/C5H12O/c1-3-5(6)4-2/h5-6H,3-4H2,1-2H3 Key: AQIXEPGDORPWBJ-UHFFFAOYAU
- SMILES: OC(CC)CC

Properties
Chemical formula	C_{5}H_{12}O
Molar mass	88.150 g·mol^{−1}
Appearance	colorless liquid
Density	0.815 g/ml
Melting point	−63.68 °C (−82.62 °F; 209.47 K)
Boiling point	115.3 °C (239.5 °F; 388.4 K)
Solubility in water	59 g/L
Solubility	soluble in acetone, benzene; very soluble in ethanol, diethyl ether
Vapor pressure	1.10 kPa

Thermochemistry
Heat capacity (C)	2.719 J·g^{−1}·K^{−1}
Std enthalpy of formation (Δ_{f}H^{⦵}_{298})	−368.9 kJ·mol^{−1} (liquid) −314.9 kJ·mol^{−1} (gas)

Hazards
- GHS labelling
Pictograms	(GHS02: Flammable) (GHS07: Exclamation mark)
Signal word	Warning
Hazard statements	H226, H315, H332, H335
Precautionary statements	P210, P233, P240, P241, P242, P243, P261, P264, P271, P280, P302+P352, P303+P361+P353, P304+P340, P317, P319, P321, P332+P317, P362+P364, P370+P378, P403+P233, P403+P235, P405, P501
Flash point	41 °C (106 °F; 314 K)
Autoignition temperature	435 °C (815 °F; 708 K)
Explosive limits	1.2–9%
- Except where otherwise noted, data are given for materials in their standard state (at 25 °C [77 °F], 100 kPa). verify (what is ?) Infobox references

3-Pentanol is a secondary alcohol and one of the eight isomers of amyl alcohol. It is found naturally and has a role as an insect pheromone.

== See also ==
- 2-Pentanol
