= 1,3-Dimethylbarbituric acid =

Names
- IUPAC name 1,3-Dimethyl-2,4,6(1H,3H,5H)-pyrimidinetrione
- Other names: 1,3-Dimethylbarbituric acid; N,N′-Dimethylbarbituric acid; 1,3-Dimethyl-pyrimidine-2,4,6-trione; 6-Hydroxy-1,3-dimethyluracil

Identifiers
CAS Number	769-42-6
3D model (JSmol)	Interactive image
ChemSpider	63056
ECHA InfoCard	100.011.101
EC Number	212-211-7
PubChem CID	69860
UNII	8ZWY29H946
CompTox Dashboard (EPA)	DTXSID0061115
- InChI: InChI=1S/C6H8N2O3/c1-7-4(9)3-5(10)8(2)6(7)11/h3H2,1-2H3 Key: VVSASNKOFCZVES-UHFFFAOYSA-N
- SMILES: O=C1N(C(=O)CC(=O)N1C)C

Properties
Chemical formula	C_{6}H_{8}N_{2}O_{3}
Molar mass	156.141 g·mol^{−1}
Acidity (pK_{a})	4.70

Hazards
- GHS labelling
Pictograms	(GHS05: Corrosive) (GHS07: Exclamation mark)
Signal word	Danger
Hazard statements	H302, H318
Precautionary statements	P264, P264+P265, P270, P280, P301+P317, P305+P354+P338, P317, P330, P501
- Except where otherwise noted, data are given for materials in their standard state (at 25 °C [77 °F], 100 kPa). Infobox references

1,3-Dimethylbarbituric acid (N,N′-dimethylbarbituric acid) is an analog of barbituric acid having a methyl group on each of the two nitrogen atoms. It is an intermediate in chemical synthesis, being easily formed by a condensation reaction of 1,3-dimethylurea and malonic acid. A notable application of that reaction and subsequent steps is Emil Fischer's first total synthesis of caffeine. The methylene group (–CH_{2}–) is fairly acidic, being alpha to two carbonyl groups, and undergoes Knoevenagel condensation reactions with aldehydes and ketones and also acylation reactions. The 1,3-dimethylbarbituric acid substructure motif has found application in several compounds that have cytotoxic properties against cancer cells.
