= 2-Methyl-1-butanol =

Names
- Preferred IUPAC name 2-Methylbutan-1-ol
- Other names 2-Methyl-1-butanol; Active amyl alcohol

Identifiers
CAS Number	137-32-6; 1565-80-6 (S)
3D model (JSmol)	Interactive image
ChEBI	CHEBI:48945
ChEMBL	ChEMBL451923
ChemSpider	8398
ECHA InfoCard	100.004.809
PubChem CID	8723
UNII	7VTJ239ASU
CompTox Dashboard (EPA)	DTXSID5027069
- InChI: InChI=1S/C5H12O/c1-3-5(2)4-6/h5-6H,3-4H2,1-2H3 Key: QPRQEDXDYOZYLA-UHFFFAOYSA-N; InChI=1/C5H12O/c1-3-5(2)4-6/h5-6H,3-4H2,1-2H3 Key: QPRQEDXDYOZYLA-UHFFFAOYAW
- SMILES: OCC(C)CC

Properties
Chemical formula	C_{5}H_{12}O
Molar mass	88.148 g/mol
Appearance	colorless liquid
Density	0.8152 g/cm^{3}
Melting point	−117.2 °C (−179.0 °F; 156.0 K)
Boiling point	127.5 °C (261.5 °F; 400.6 K)
Solubility in water	31 g/L
Solubility	organic solvents
Vapor pressure	3 mm Hg
Viscosity	4.453 mPa·s

Thermochemistry
Std enthalpy of formation (Δ_{f}H^{⦵}_{298})	−356.6 kJ·mol^{−1} (liquid) −301.4 kJ·mol^{−1} (gas)

Hazards
Autoignition temperature	385 °C (725 °F; 658 K)

Related compounds
Related compounds	Amyl alcohol
- Except where otherwise noted, data are given for materials in their standard state (at 25 °C [77 °F], 100 kPa). verify (what is ?) Infobox references

2-Methyl-1-butanol (IUPAC name, also called active amyl alcohol) is an organic compound with the formula CH_{3}CH_{2}CH(CH_{3})CH_{2}OH. It is one of several isomers of amyl alcohol. This colorless liquid occurs naturally in trace amounts and has attracted some attention as a potential biofuel, exploiting its hydrophobic (gasoline-like) and branched structure. It is chiral.

== Occurrence ==
2-Methyl-1-butanol is a component of many mixtures of commercial amyl alcohols.

2M1B also occurs naturally. For example, fusel alcohols like 2M1B are grain fermentation byproducts, and therefore trace amounts of 2M1B are present in many alcoholic beverages. Also, it is one of the many components of the aroma of various fungi and fruit, e.g., the summer truffle, tomato, and cantaloupe.

== Production and reactions ==
2-Methyl-1-butanol has been produced from glucose by genetically modified E. coli. 2-Keto-3-methylvalerate, a precursor to threonine, is converted to the target alcohol by the sequential action of 2-keto acid decarboxylase and dehydrogenase. It can be derived from fusel oil (because it occurs naturally in fruits such as grapes) or manufactured by either the oxo process or via the halogenation of pentane.

== See also ==
- 2-Methyl-2-butanol
