= 3-Methylfuran =

Names
- Preferred IUPAC name 3-Methylfuran
- Other names 3MF

Identifiers
CAS Number	930-27-8
3D model (JSmol)	Interactive image
ChemSpider	12998
ECHA InfoCard	100.126.998
PubChem CID	13587
UNII	5R72A0440N
CompTox Dashboard (EPA)	DTXSID10239228
- InChI: InChI=1S/C5H6O/c1-5-2-3-6-4-5/h2-4H,1H3 Key: KJRRQXYWFQKJIP-UHFFFAOYSA-N; InChI=1/C5H6O/c1-5-2-3-6-4-5/h2-4H,1H3 Key: KJRRQXYWFQKJIP-UHFFFAOYAM
- SMILES: CC1=COC=C1

Properties
Chemical formula	C_{5}H_{6}O
Molar mass	82.102 g·mol^{−1}
- Except where otherwise noted, data are given for materials in their standard state (at 25 °C [77 °F], 100 kPa). Infobox references

3-Methylfuran is an organic compound with the formula C_{5}H_{6}O. It is formed from the gas-phase reaction of hydroxyl radical with isoprene.

In mice, it is toxic by inhalation.

== See also ==
- 2-Methylfuran
