= Tert-Amyl alcohol =

tert-Amyl alcohol
- Stereo, skeletal formula of 2-methyl-2-butanol

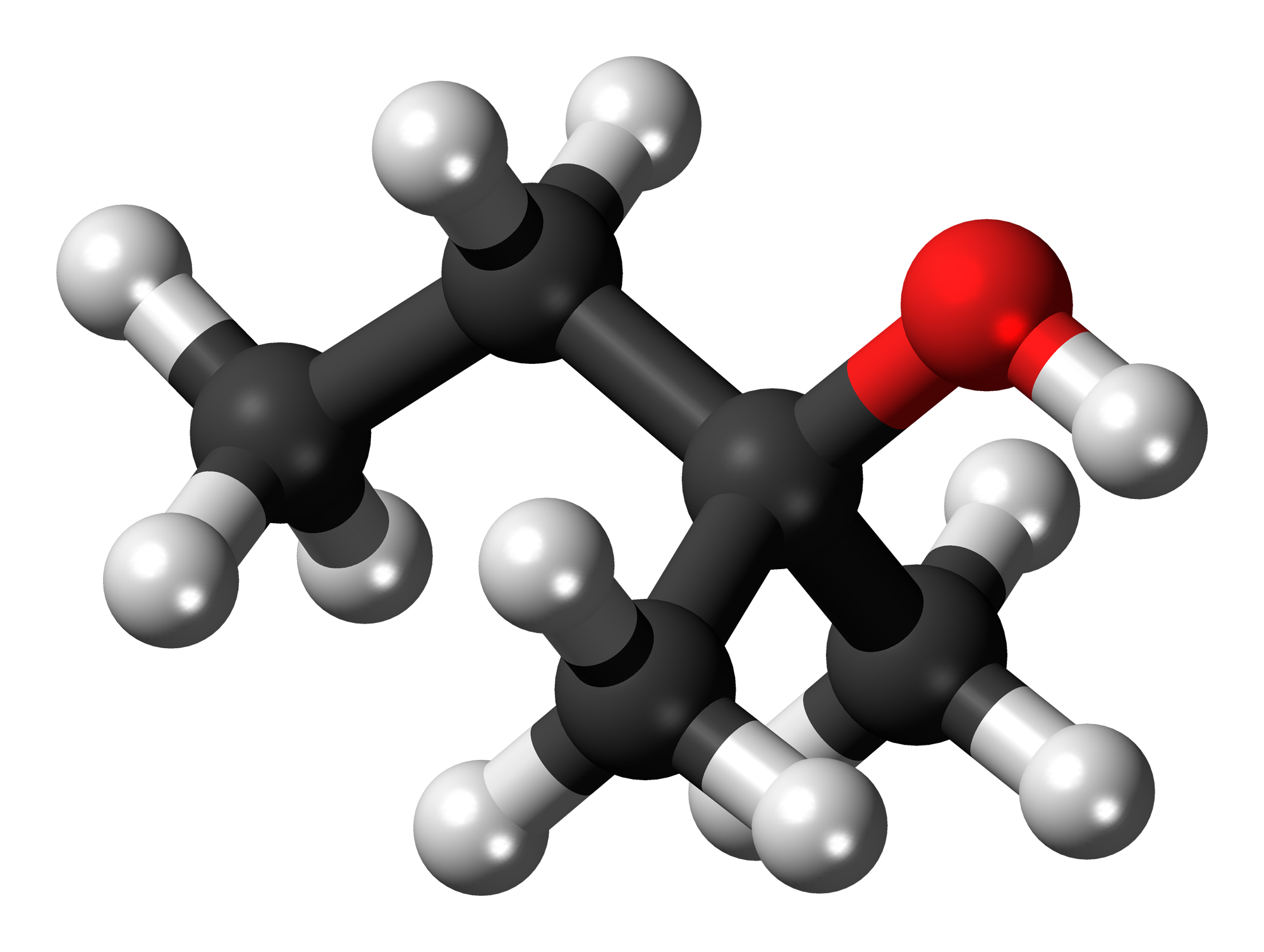
Ball-and-stick model of 2-methyl-2-butanol
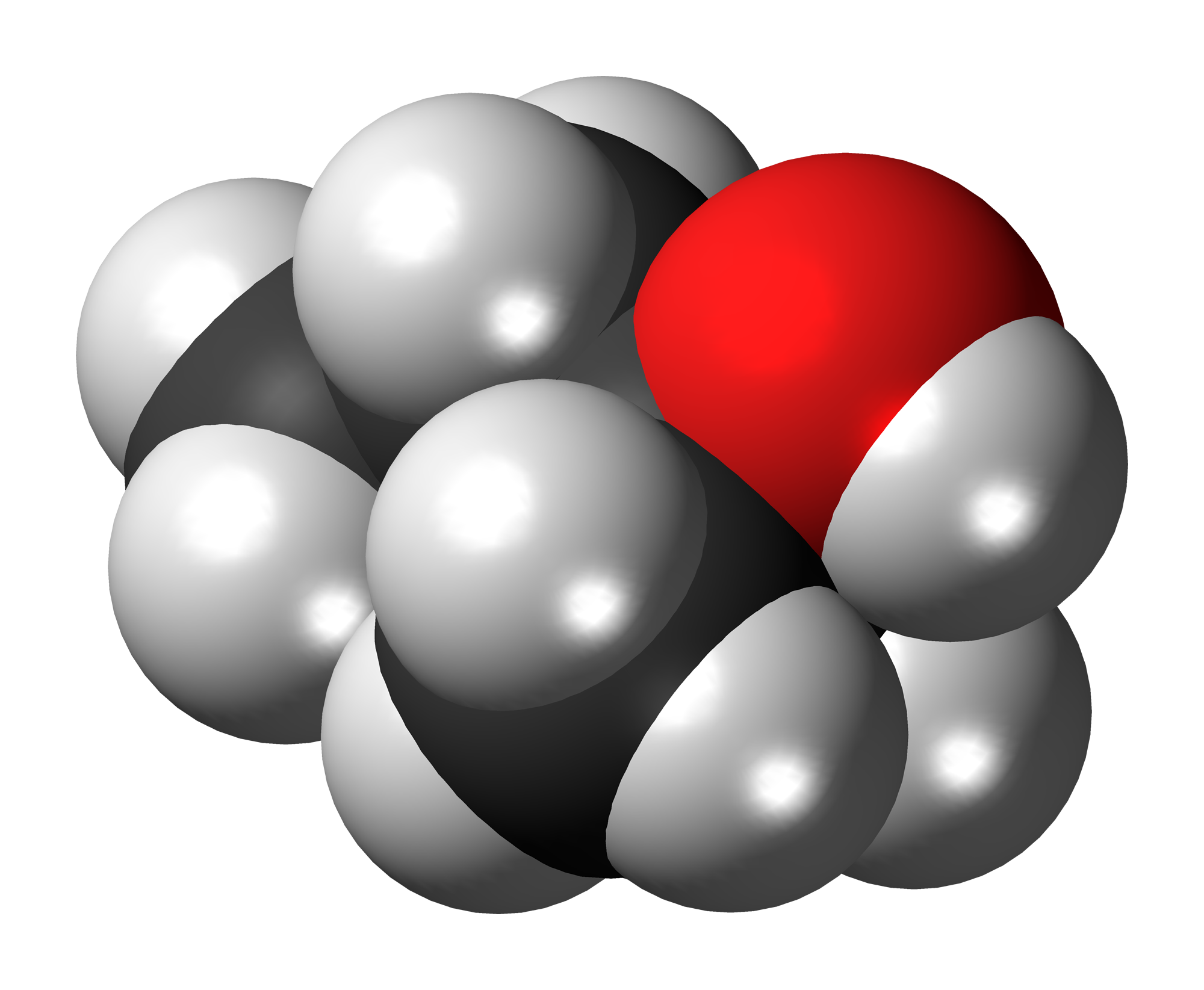
Space-filling model of the 2-methyl-2-butanol

Names
- Preferred IUPAC name 2-Methylbutan-2-ol
- Other names 2-Methyl-2-butanol tert-Amyl alcohol t-Amylol; TAA tert-Pentyl alcohol 2-Methyl-2-butyl alcohol t-Pentylol; Amylene hydrate Dimethylethylcarbinol

Identifiers
CAS Number	75-85-4
3D model (JSmol)	Interactive image
Beilstein Reference	1361351
ChEBI	CHEBI:132750
ChEMBL	ChEMBL44658
ChemSpider	6165
ECHA InfoCard	100.000.827
EC Number	200-908-9
KEGG	D02931
MeSH	tert-amyl+alcohol
PubChem CID	6405
RTECS number	SC0175000
UNII	69C393R11Z
UN number	1105
CompTox Dashboard (EPA)	DTXSID0041436
- InChI: InChI=1S/C5H12O/c1-4-5(2,3)6/h6H,4H2,1-3H3 Key: MSXVEPNJUHWQHW-UHFFFAOYSA-N
- SMILES: CCC(C)(C)O

Properties
Chemical formula	C_{5}H_{12}O
Molar mass	88.150 g·mol^{−1}
Appearance	Colorless liquid
Odor	Camphorous
Density	0.805 g/cm^{3}
Melting point	−9 °C; 16 °F; 264 K
Boiling point	101 to 103 °C; 214 to 217 °F; 374 to 376 K
Solubility in water	120 g·dm^{−3}
Solubility	soluble in water, benzene, chloroform, diethylether and ethanol
log P	1.0950.5:1 volume ratio
Vapor pressure	1.6 kPa (at 20 °C)
Magnetic susceptibility (χ)	−7.09×10^{−5} cm^{3}/mol
Refractive index (n_{D})	1.405
Viscosity	4.4740 mPa·s (at 298.15 K)

Thermochemistry
Std molar entropy (S^{⦵}_{298})	229.3 J K^{−1} mol^{−1}
Std enthalpy of formation (Δ_{f}H^{⦵}_{298})	−380.0 to −379.0 kJ mol^{−1}
Std enthalpy of combustion (Δ_{c}H^{⦵}_{298})	−3.3036 to −3.3026 MJ mol^{−1}

Hazards
- GHS labelling
Pictograms	(GHS02: Flammable) (GHS07: Exclamation mark)
Signal word	Danger
Hazard statements	H225, H315, H332, H335
Precautionary statements	P210, P261
NFPA 704 (fire diamond)	1 3 0
Flash point	19 °C (66 °F; 292 K)
Autoignition temperature	437 °C (819 °F; 710 K)
Explosive limits	9%
Safety data sheet (SDS)	hazard.com
- Except where otherwise noted, data are given for materials in their standard state (at 25 °C [77 °F], 100 kPa). verify (what is ?) Infobox references

tert-Amyl alcohol (TAA) or 2-methylbutan-2-ol (2M2B), is a branched pentanol.

Historically, TAA has been used as an anesthetic and more recently as a recreational drug. TAA is mostly a positive allosteric modulator for GABA_{A} receptors in the same way as ethanol. The psychotropic effects of TAA and ethanol are similar, though distinct. Impact on coordination and balance are proportionately more prominent with TAA, which is significantly more potent by weight than ethanol. Its appeal as an alternative to ethanol may stem from its lack of a hangover (due to different metabolic pathways) and the fact that it is often not detected on standard drug test.

TAA is a colorless liquid with a burning flavor and an unpleasant odor similar to paraldehyde with a hint of camphor. TAA remains liquid at room temperature, making it a useful alternative solvent to tert-butyl alcohol.

== Production ==
TAA is primarily made by the hydration of 2-methyl-2-butene in the presence of an acidic catalyst.

== Natural occurrence ==
Fusel alcohols like TAA are grain fermentation byproducts, and therefore trace amounts of TAA are present in many alcoholic beverages. Traces of TAA have been detected in other foods, like fried bacon, cassava and rooibos tea. TAA is also present in rabbit milk and seems to play a role in pheromone-inducing suckling in the newborn rabbit.

== History ==
From about the 1880s to the 1950s, TAA was used as an anesthetic with the contemporary name of amylene hydrate, but it was rarely used because more efficient drugs existed. In the 1930s, TAA was mainly used as a solvent for the primary anesthetic tribromoethanol (TBE). Like chloroform, TBE is toxic for the liver, so the use of such solutions declined in the 1940s in humans. TBE-TAA-solutions remained in use as short-acting anesthetics for laboratory mice and rats. Such solutions are sometimes called Avertin, which was a brand name for the now discontinued TAA and TBE solution with a volume ratio of 0.5:1 made by Winthrop Laboratories. TAA has emerged recently as a recreational drug.

== Use and effects ==
Ingestion or inhalation of TAA causes euphoria, sedative, hypnotic, and anticonvulsant effects similar to ethanol. When ingested, the effects of TAA may begin in about 30 minutes and can last up to 1–2 days. 2–4 grams of TAA is sufficient to produce a hypnotic effect. About 100 g of ethanol induces a similar level of sedation.

== Overdose and toxicity ==
The smallest known dose of TAA that has killed a person is 30 mL.

An overdose produces symptoms similar to alcohol poisoning and is a medical emergency due to the sedative/depressant properties which manifest in overdose as potentially lethal respiratory depression. Sudden loss of consciousness, simultaneous respiratory and metabolic acidosis, fast heartbeat, increased blood pressure, pupil constriction, coma, respiratory depression and death may follow from an overdose. The oral LD_{50} in rats is 1 g/kg. The subcutaneous LD_{50} in mice is 2.1 g/kg.

== Metabolism ==
In rats, TAA is primarily metabolized via glucuronidation, as well as by oxidation to 2-methyl-2,3-butanediol. It is likely that the same path is followed in humans, though older sources suggest TAA is excreted unchanged.

TAA oxidises to 2-methyl-2,3-butanediol.

The use of TAA cannot be detected with general ethanol tests or other ordinary drug tests. Its use can be detected from a blood or a urine sample by using gas chromatography–mass spectrometry for up to 48 hours after consumption.

== See also ==
- 1-Ethynylcyclohexanol
- 2-Methyl-1-butanol
- 2-Methyl-2-pentanol
- 3-Methyl-3-pentanol
- Alcohols
- Amyl alcohol
- Diethylpropanediol
- Pentanols
- Ethchlorvynol
- Methylpentynol
