= 3-Methyl-2-butanol =

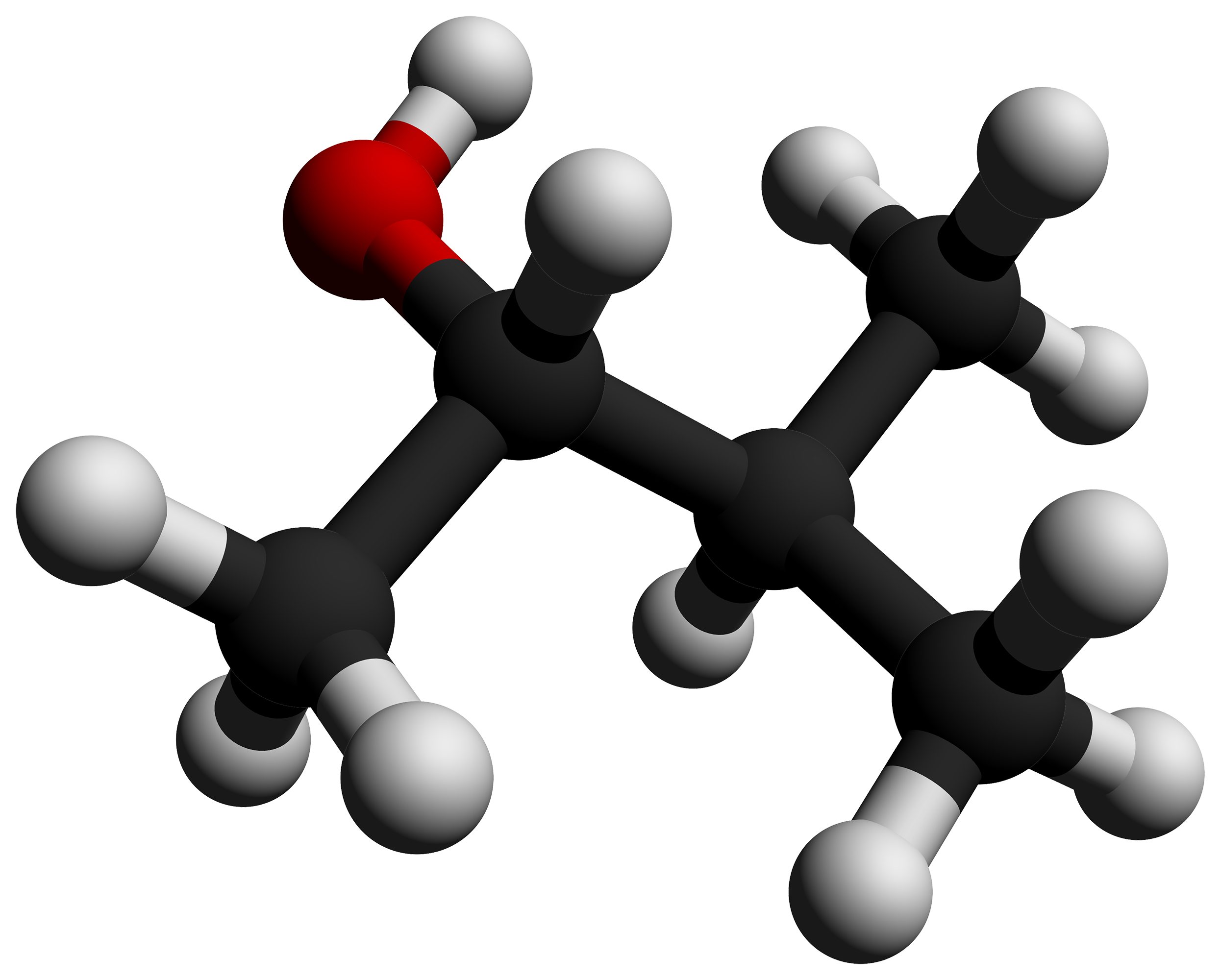

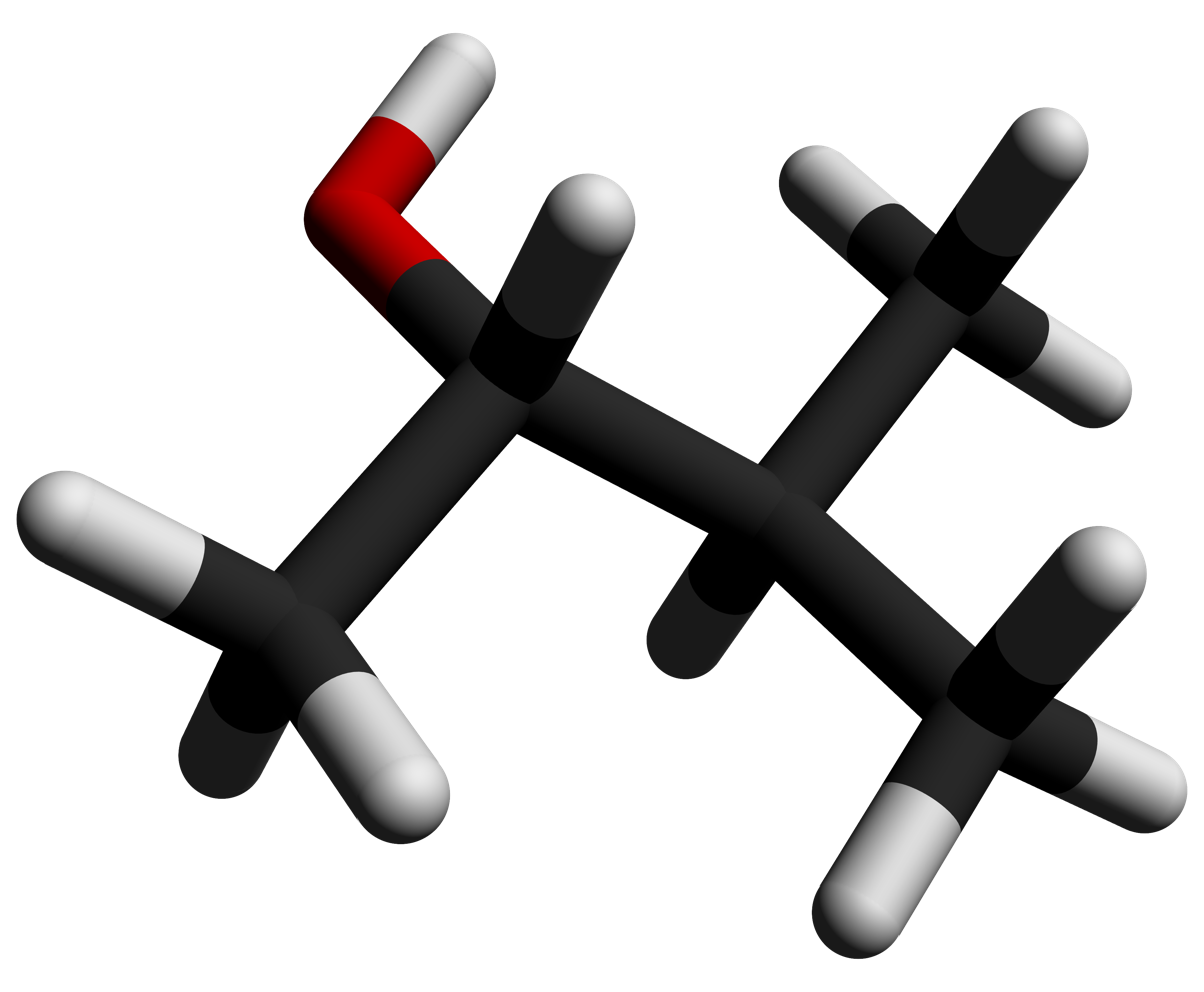

Names
- Preferred IUPAC name 3-Methylbutan-2-ol

Identifiers
CAS Number	598-75-4; 1572-93-6 (R); 1517-66-4 (S)
3D model (JSmol)	Interactive image
ChEBI	CHEBI:77517
ChEMBL	ChEMBL443470
ChemSpider	11239; 553660 (R); 5367305 (S)
ECHA InfoCard	100.009.047
EC Number	209-950-2
PubChem CID	11732; 638099 (R); 6999784 (S)
UNII	93FF0F303R
UN number	1105
CompTox Dashboard (EPA)	DTXSID20862268
- InChI: InChI=1S/C5H12O/c1-4(2)5(3)6/h4-6H,1-3H3 Key: MXLMTQWGSQIYOW-UHFFFAOYSA-N
- SMILES: CC(C)C(C)O

Properties
Chemical formula	C_{5}H_{12}O
Molar mass	88.150 g·mol^{−1}
Appearance	Colorless liquid
Density	818 mg cm^{−3}
Boiling point	109 to 115 °C; 228 to 239 °F; 382 to 388 K
Solubility in water	59 g dm^{−3}
Solubility in ethanol	miscible
log P	1.036
Vapor pressure	1.20 kPa

Thermochemistry
Heat capacity (C)	245.9 J K^{−1} mol^{−1}
Std enthalpy of formation (Δ_{f}H^{⦵}_{298})	−371.3–−368.5 kJ mol^{−1}
Std enthalpy of combustion (Δ_{c}H^{⦵}_{298})	−3.3157–−3.3145 MJ mol^{−1}

Hazards
- GHS labelling
Pictograms	(GHS02: Flammable) (GHS07: Exclamation mark)
Signal word	Warning
Hazard statements	H226, H332, H335
Precautionary statements	P261
NFPA 704 (fire diamond)	1 3 0
Flash point	34 °C (93 °F; 307 K)

Related compounds
Related compounds	Amyl alcohol
- Except where otherwise noted, data are given for materials in their standard state (at 25 °C [77 °F], 100 kPa). verify (what is ?) Infobox references

3-Methyl-2-butanol (IUPAC name, commonly called sec-isoamyl alcohol) is an organic chemical compound. It is used as a solvent and an intermediate in the manufacture of other chemicals.
