= 2-Methylfuran =

- Skeletal formula

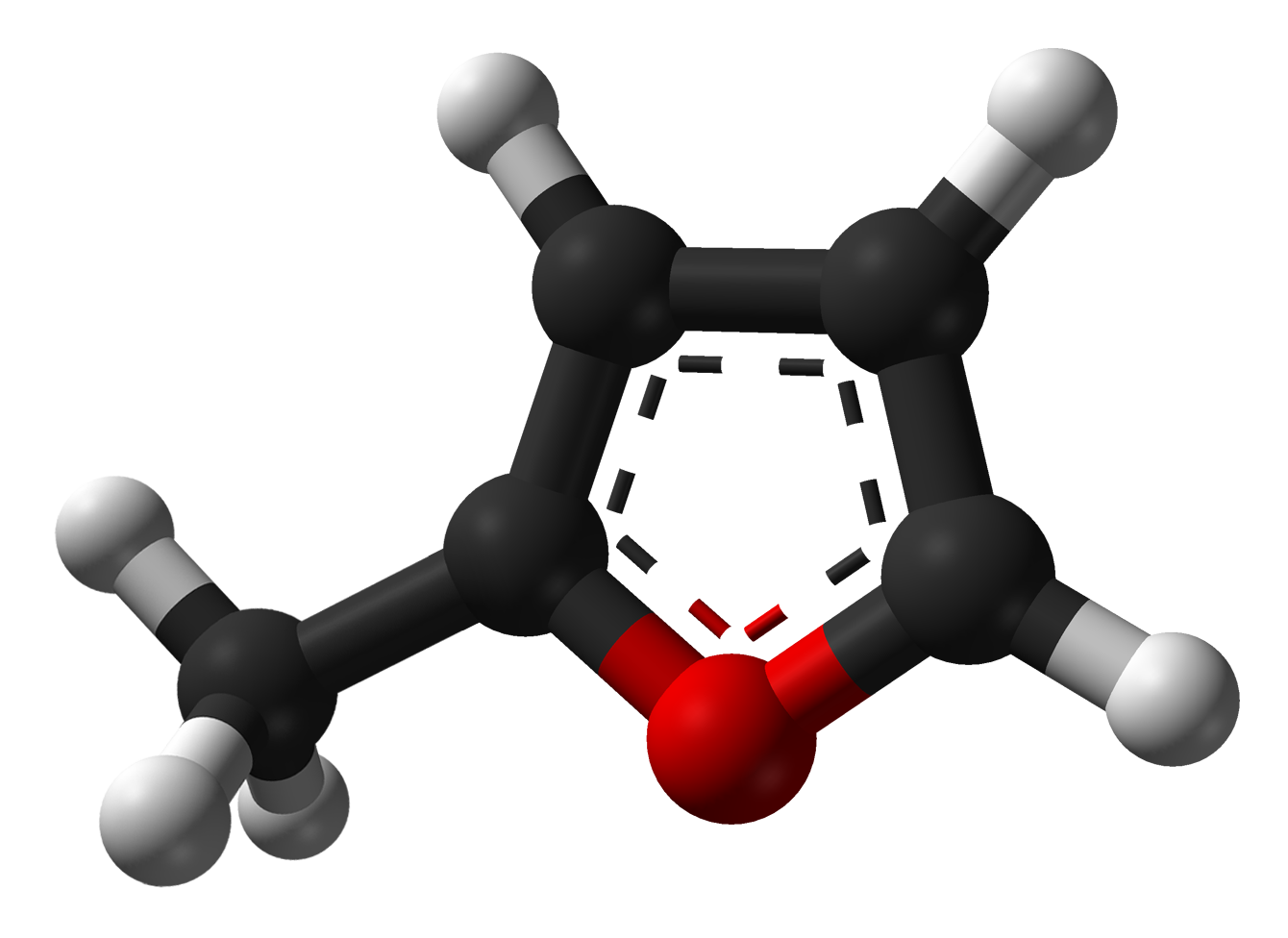
- Ball-and-stick model

Names
- Preferred IUPAC name 2-Methylfuran

Identifiers
CAS Number	534-22-5
3D model (JSmol)	Interactive image; Interactive image
ChEBI	CHEBI:88912
ChemSpider	10340
ECHA InfoCard	100.007.814
EC Number	208-594-5
PubChem CID	10797
UNII	51O3BGW3F2
CompTox Dashboard (EPA)	DTXSID9025611
- InChI: InChI=1S/C5H6O/c1-5-3-2-4-6-5/h2-4H,1H3 Key: VQKFNUFAXTZWDK-UHFFFAOYSA-N; InChI=1/C5H6O/c1-5-3-2-4-6-5/h2-4H,1H3 Key: VQKFNUFAXTZWDK-UHFFFAOYAB
- SMILES: o1c(ccc1)C; Cc1ccco1

Properties
Chemical formula	C_{5}H_{6}O
Molar mass	82.10 g/mol
Appearance	Colorless to pale yellow/green liquid
Density	0.91546 g/mL (20 °C)
Boiling point	64 °C (147 °F; 337 K)
Solubility in water	3000 mg/L (20 °C)
Solubility in ethanol	Soluble
Refractive index (n_{D})	1.4332 (20 °C)

Hazards
- Occupational safety and health (OHS/OSH)
Main hazards	Very flammable, harmful
NFPA 704 (fire diamond)	2 3 1
Flash point	−22 °C; −8 °F; 251 K
- Except where otherwise noted, data are given for materials in their standard state (at 25 °C [77 °F], 100 kPa). verify (what is ?) Infobox references

2-Methylfuran, also known with the older name of sylvan, is a flammable, water-insoluble liquid with a chocolate odor, found naturally in Myrtle and Dutch Lavender used as a FEMA GRAS flavoring substance, with the potential for use in alternative fuels.

== Manufacture ==
2-Methylfuran is an article of commerce (chemical intermediate) and is normally manufactured by catalytic hydrogenolysis of furfural alcohol or via a hydrogenation-hydrogenolysis sequence from furfural in the vapor phase.

== See also ==
- Swiftfuel
