= C6H14O =

The molecular formula C_{6}H_{14}O may refer to:

- tert-Amyl methyl ether
- Diisopropyl ether
- Dimethylbutanols
  - 2,2-Dimethyl-1-butanol
  - 3,3-Dimethyl-1-butanol
- Dipropyl ether
- 2-Ethyl-1-butanol
- Ethyl tert-butyl ether
- Hexanols
  - 1-Hexanol
  - 2-Hexanol
  - 3-Hexanol
- Methylpentanols
  - 2-Methyl-1-pentanol
  - 3-Methyl-1-pentanol
  - 4-Methyl-1-pentanol
  - 2-Methyl-2-pentanol
  - 3-Methyl-2-pentanol
  - 4-Methyl-2-pentanol
  - 2-Methyl-3-pentanol
  - 3-Methyl-3-pentanol
- Pinacolyl alcohol
