= List of alkanols =

This list is ordered by the number of carbon atoms in an alcohol.

== C1 ==
- Methanol

== C2 ==
- Ethanol

== C3 ==
- 1-Propanol
- Isopropyl alcohol

== C4 ==
- n-Butanol
- Isobutanol
- sec-Butanol
- tert-Butyl alcohol

== C5 ==
- 1-Pentanol
- Isoamyl alcohol
- 2-Methyl-1-butanol
- Neopentyl alcohol
- 2-Pentanol
- 3-Methyl-2-butanol
- 3-Pentanol
- tert-Amyl alcohol

== C6 ==
- 1-Hexanol
- 2-Hexanol
- 3-Hexanol
- 2-Methyl-1-pentanol
- 3-Methyl-1-pentanol
- 4-Methyl-1-pentanol
- 2-Methyl-2-pentanol
- 3-Methyl-2-pentanol
- 4-Methyl-2-pentanol
- 2-Methyl-3-pentanol
- 3-Methyl-3-pentanol
- 2,2-Dimethyl-1-butanol
- 2,3-Dimethyl-1-butanol
- 3,3-Dimethyl-1-butanol
