= Methylpentanol =

Methylpentanol may refer to:

- 2-Methyl-1-pentanol
- 3-Methyl-1-pentanol
- 4-Methyl-1-pentanol
- 2-Methyl-2-pentanol
- 3-Methyl-2-pentanol
- 4-Methyl-2-pentanol
- 2-Methyl-3-pentanol
- 3-Methyl-3-pentanol
