= DMB =

DMB may refer to:

- "D.M.B.", a song by ASAP Rocky (2022)
- DMB Development, a Limited Liability Corporation based in Scottsdale, Arizona
- DaMarcus Beasley, nicknamed DMB, an American soccer player
- Dave Matthews Band, also known as DMB, a U.S. rock band
- Del McCoury Band, a U.S. bluegrass band
- Dead Man Blues, a short story collection by Cornell Woolrich (1948)
- Delaware Memorial Bridge, a set of twin suspension bridges on the Delaware River
- Diamond Mind Baseball, a computer baseball simulation game
- Digital multimedia broadcasting, a South Korean digital radio transmission technology
- Dimethylbutane
- Dimethylbutanol
- Dry matter basis, a technique of measuring animal feed content

== See also ==
- DMBQ, a Japanese rock band
- DMBT1, a protein-coding gene in the species Homo sapiens
- Do Me Bad Things (DMBT), an English rock band
