= Dimethylbutanol =

Dimethylbutanol may refer to:

- 2,2-Dimethyl-1-butanol
- 3,3-Dimethyl-1-butanol (DMB)

== See also ==
- Dimethylbutane
- Hexanol
