= Pinacolyl alcohol =

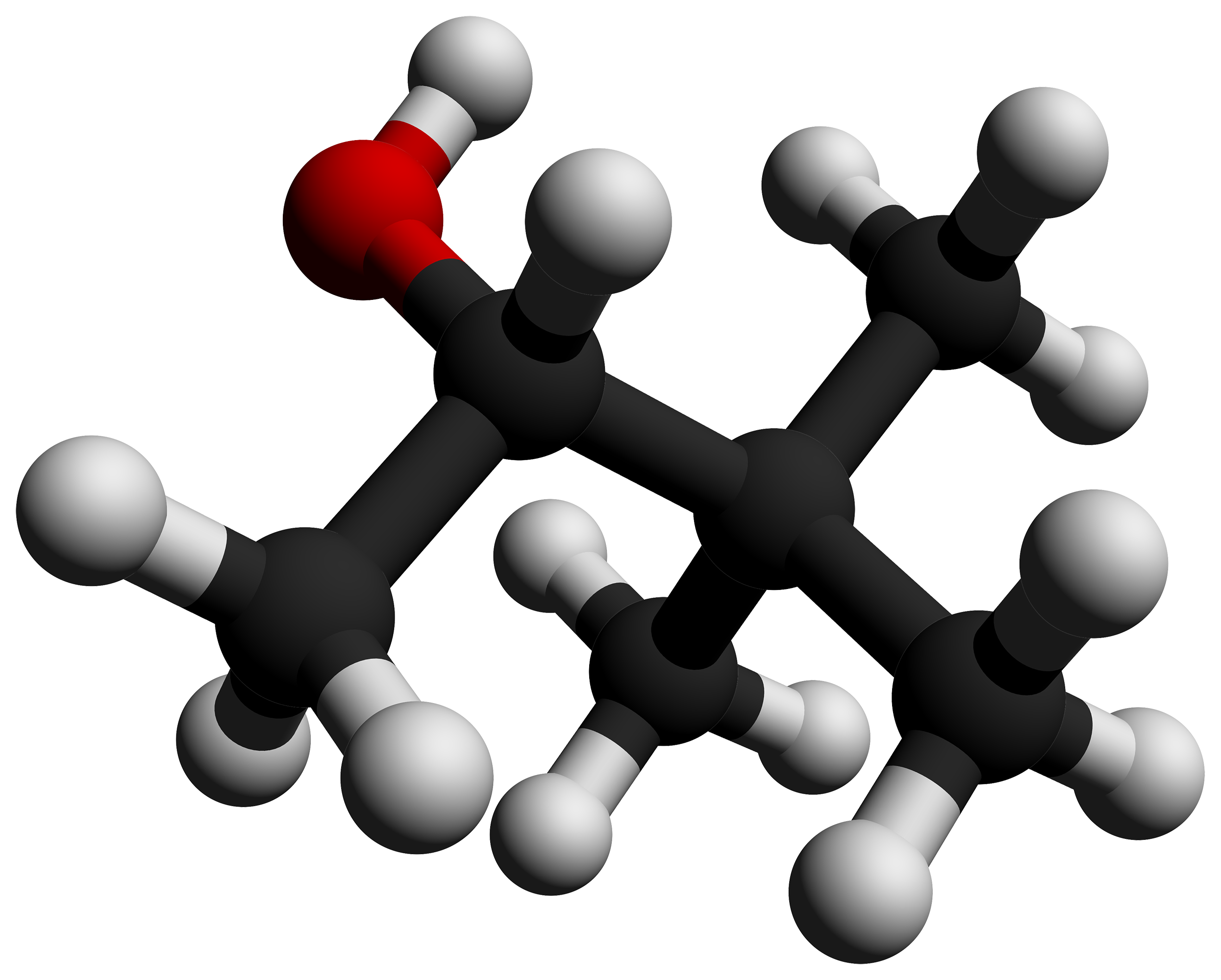

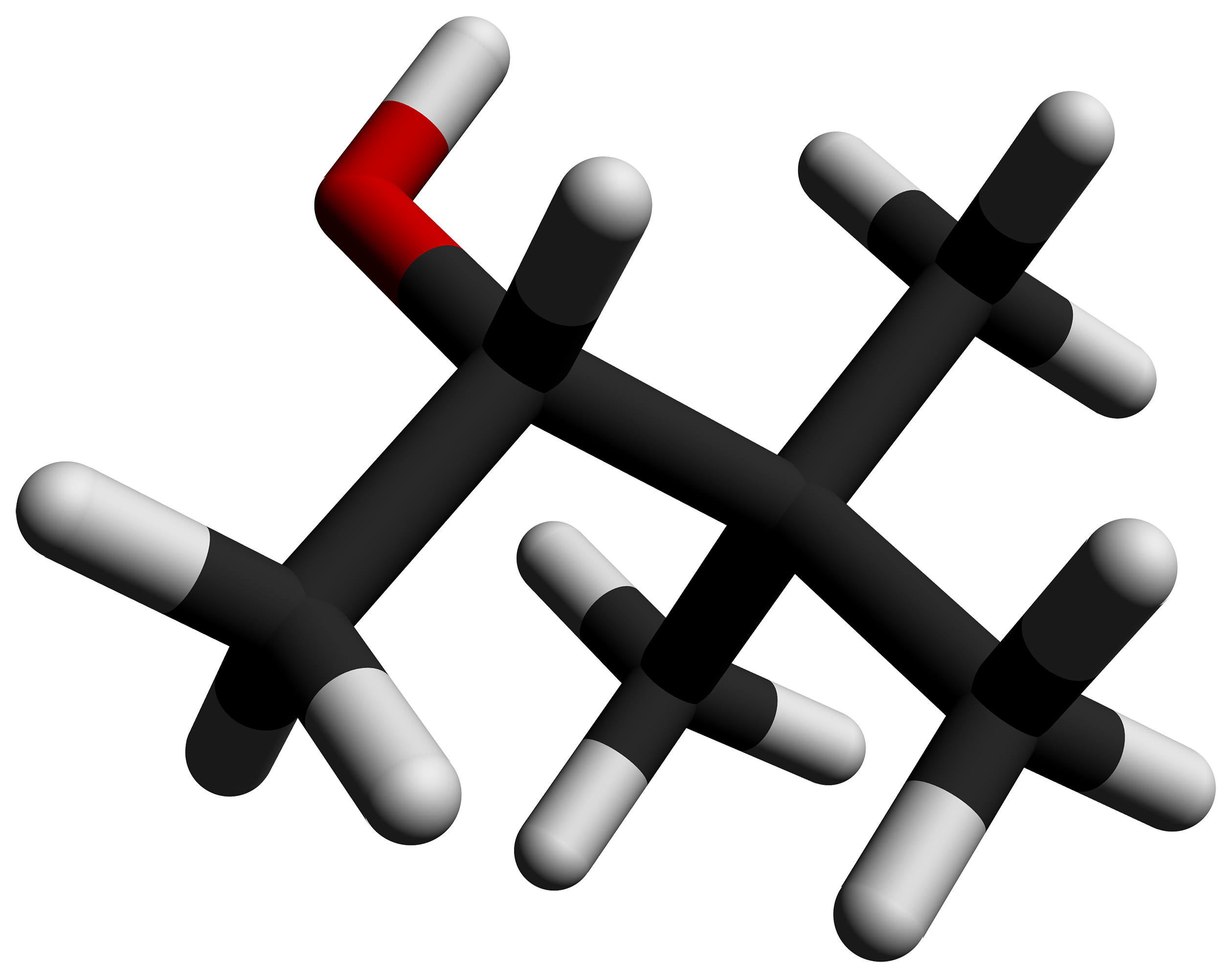

Names
- Preferred IUPAC name 3,3-Dimethylbutan-2-ol
- Other names 3,3-Dimethyl-2-butanol

Identifiers
CAS Number	464-07-3
3D model (JSmol)	Interactive image; Interactive image
ChEMBL	ChEMBL457417
ChemSpider	9650
ECHA InfoCard	100.006.681
PubChem CID	10045
UNII	5BV6T1107J
CompTox Dashboard (EPA)	DTXSID10861947
- InChI: InChI=1S/C6H14O/c1-5(7)6(2,3)4/h5,7H,1-4H3 Key: DFOXKPDFWGNLJU-UHFFFAOYSA-N
- SMILES: CC(C)(C)C(C)O; OC(C)C(C)(C)C

Properties
Chemical formula	C_{6}H_{14}O
Molar mass	102.177 g·mol^{−1}
Density	0.8122 g/cm^{3}
Melting point	5.6 °C (42.1 °F; 278.8 K)
Boiling point	120.4 °C (248.7 °F; 393.5 K)
Solubility in water	25 g/L
Solubility	very soluble in ethanol, diethyl ether
- Except where otherwise noted, data are given for materials in their standard state (at 25 °C [77 °F], 100 kPa). verify (what is ?) Infobox references

Pinacolyl alcohol (also known as 3,3-dimethylbutan-2-ol and as pine alcohol) is one of the isomeric hexanols and a secondary alcohol.

Pinacolyl alcohol appears on the List of Schedule 2 substances of the Chemical Weapons Convention as a precursor for the nerve agent soman.

Not to be confused with hydroxypinacolone [38895-88-4], which is a separate chemical.

== See also ==
- Soman
- Isopropyl alcohol
