= 1-Hexanol =

Hexyl alcohol
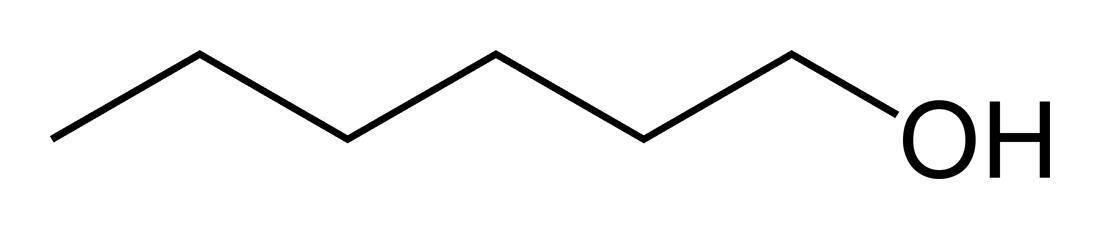
Skeletal formula of 1-hexanol
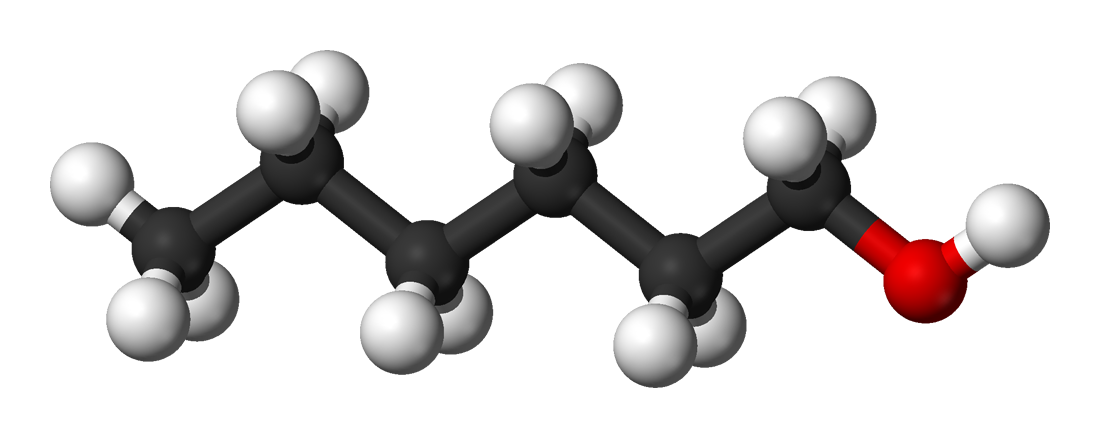
Spacefill formula of 1-hexanol

Names
- Preferred IUPAC name Hexan-1-ol
- Other names amyl carbinol

Identifiers
CAS Number	111-27-3
3D model (JSmol)	Interactive image
Abbreviations	HxOH n-HxOH nHxOH^{n}HxOH
Beilstein Reference	969167
ChEBI	CHEBI:87393
ChEMBL	ChEMBL14085
ChemSpider	7812
ECHA InfoCard	100.003.503
EC Number	203-852-3
MeSH	1-Hexanol
PubChem CID	8103
RTECS number	MQ4025000
UNII	6CP2QER8GS
UN number	2282
CompTox Dashboard (EPA)	DTXSID8021931
- InChI: InChI=1S/C6H14O/c1-2-3-4-5-6-7/h7H,2-6H2,1H3 Key: ZSIAUFGUXNUGDI-UHFFFAOYSA-N
- SMILES: CCCCCCO

Properties
Chemical formula	C_{6}H_{14}O
Molar mass	102.177 g·mol^{−1}
Appearance	colorless liquid
Density	0.82 g cm^{−3} (at 20 °C)
Melting point	−45 °C (−49 °F; 228 K)
Boiling point	157 °C (315 °F; 430 K)
Solubility in water	5.9 g/L (at 20 °C)
log P	1.858
Vapor pressure	100 Pa (at 25.6 °C)
Refractive index (n_{D})	1.4178 (at 20 °C)

Thermochemistry
Heat capacity (C)	243.2 J K^{−1} mol^{−1}
Std molar entropy (S^{⦵}_{298})	287.4 J K^{−1} mol^{−1}
Std enthalpy of formation (Δ_{f}H^{⦵}_{298})	−377.5 kJ mol^{−1}
Std enthalpy of combustion (Δ_{c}H^{⦵}_{298})	−3.98437 MJ mol^{−1}

Hazards
- GHS labelling
Pictograms	(GHS07: Exclamation mark)
Signal word	Warning
Hazard statements	H302
Precautionary statements	P264, P270, P301+P317, P330, P501
NFPA 704 (fire diamond)	1 2 0
Flash point	59 °C (138 °F; 332 K)
Autoignition temperature	293 °C (559 °F; 566 K)
Safety data sheet (SDS)	ICSC 1084
- Except where otherwise noted, data are given for materials in their standard state (at 25 °C [77 °F], 100 kPa). verify (what is ?) Infobox references

1-Hexanol (IUPAC name hexan-1-ol) is an organic alcohol with a six-carbon chain and a condensed structural formula of CH_{3}(CH_{2})_{5}OH. This colorless liquid is slightly soluble in water, but miscible with diethyl ether and ethanol. Two additional straight chain isomers of 1-hexanol, 2-hexanol and 3-hexanol, exist, both of which differing by the location of the hydroxyl group. Many isomeric alcohols have the formula C_{6}H_{13}OH. It is used in the perfume industry.

== Preparation ==
Hexanol is produced industrially by the oligomerization of ethylene using triethylaluminium followed by oxidation of the alkylaluminium products. An idealized synthesis is shown:

Al(C_{2}H_{5})_{3} + 6C_{2}H_{4} → Al(C_{6}H_{13})_{3}
Al(C_{6}H_{13})_{3} + 1 1/2O_{2} + 3H_{2}O → 3HOC_{6}H_{13} + Al(OH)_{3}

The process generates a range of oligomers that are separated by distillation.

=== Alternative methods ===
Another method of preparation entails hydroformylation of 1-pentene followed by hydrogenation of the resulting aldehydes. This method is practiced in industry to produce mixtures of isomeric C_{6}-alcohols, which are precursors to plasticizers.

In principle, 1-hexene could be converted to 1-hexanol by hydroboration (diborane in tetrahydrofuran followed by treatment with hydrogen peroxide and sodium hydroxide):

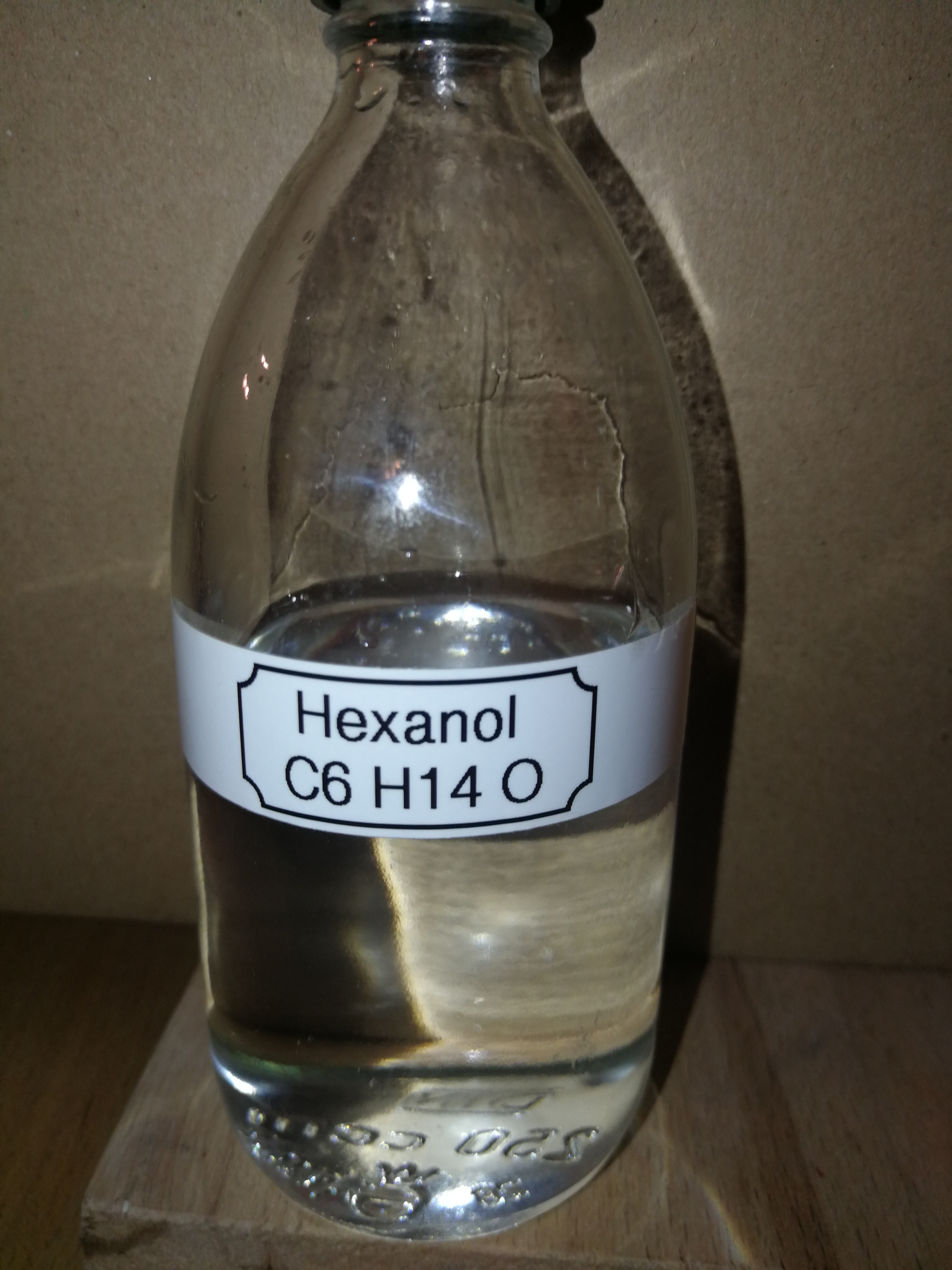
Hexan-1-ol

This method is instructive and useful in laboratory synthesis but of no practical relevance because of the commercial availability of inexpensive 1-hexanol from ethylene.

== Occurrence in nature ==
1-Hexanol is believed to be a component of the odour of freshly mown grass. Alarm pheromones emitted by the Koschevnikov gland of honey bees contain 1-hexanol. It also is partly responsible for the fragrance of strawberries.

== See also ==
- Cis-3-Hexenal, another volatile organic compound, is also considered responsible for the freshly mowed grass odor.
