= Dimethylbutane =

Dimethylbutane (DMB) may refer to:

- 2,2-Dimethylbutane
- 2,3-Dimethylbutane

== See also ==
- Dimethylbutanol
