= Hexanol =

Chemical compound (C6H13OH)

Hexanol may refer to any of the following isomeric organic compounds with the formula C_{6}H_{13}OH:

Structure	Type	IUPAC name	Boiling point (°C)
	Primary	Hexan-1-ol	158
	Secondary	Hexan-2-ol	140
	Secondary	Hexan-3-ol	135
	Primary	2-Methylpentan-1-ol	147
	Primary	3-Methylpentan-1-ol	152
	Primary	4-Methylpentan-1-ol	151
	Tertiary	2-Methylpentan-2-ol	121
	Secondary	3-Methylpentan-2-ol	134
	Secondary	4-Methylpentan-2-ol	131
	Secondary	2-Methylpentan-3-ol	126
	Tertiary	3-Methylpentan-3-ol	122
	Primary	2,2-Dimethylbutan-1-ol	137
	Primary	2,3-Dimethylbutan-1-ol	145
	Primary	3,3-Dimethylbutan-1-ol	143
	Tertiary	2,3-Dimethylbutan-2-ol	119
	Secondary	3,3-Dimethylbutan-2-ol	120
	Primary	2-Ethylbutan-1-ol	146

== See also ==
- Cyclohexanol
- Amyl alcohol
