= 2-Hexanol =

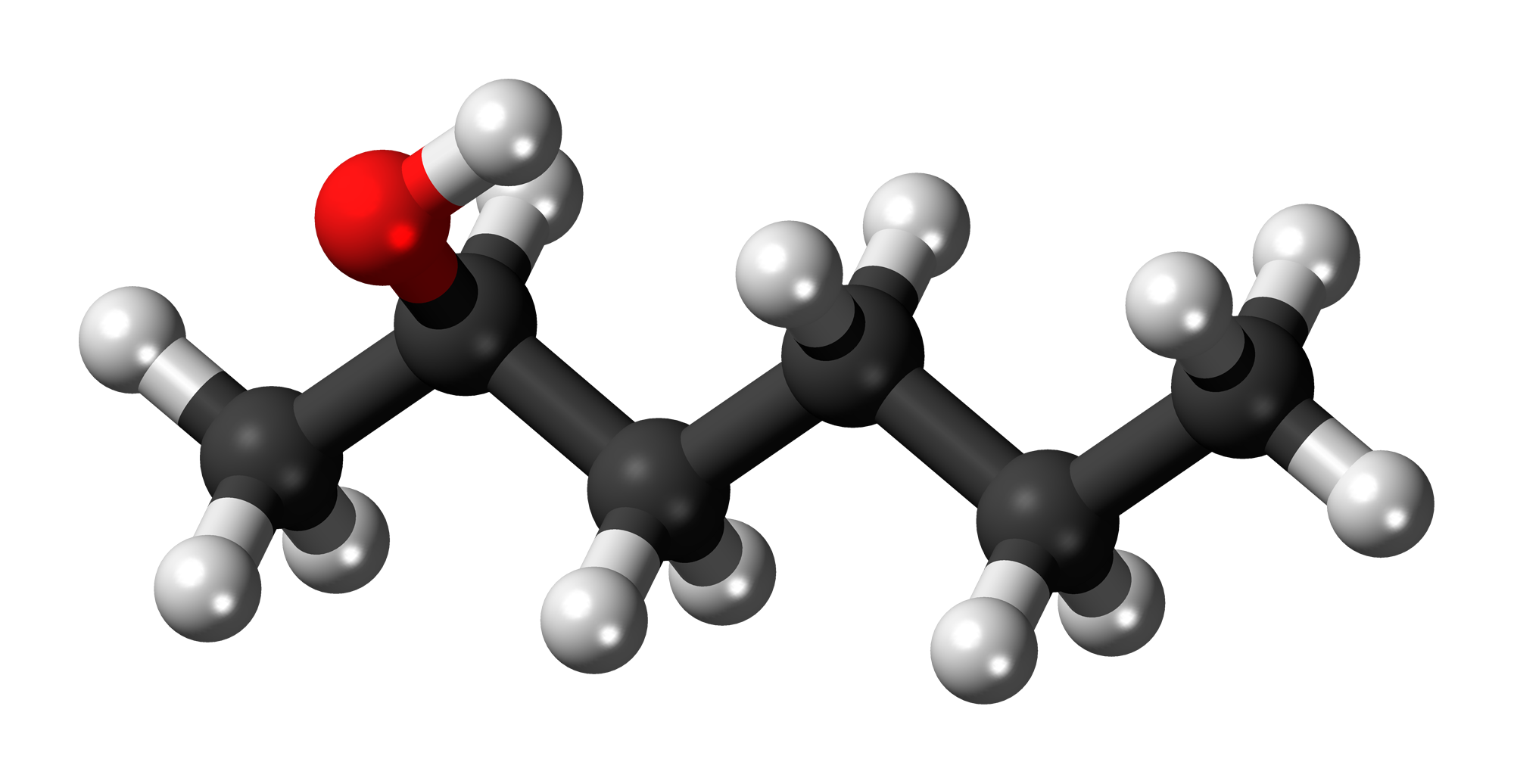

Names
- Preferred IUPAC name Hexan-2-ol

Identifiers
CAS Number	626-93-7
3D model (JSmol)	Interactive image
ChEBI	CHEBI:88370
ChEMBL	ChEMBL45425
ChemSpider	11794
ECHA InfoCard	100.009.975
PubChem CID	12297
UNII	9CDT0V6T4P
CompTox Dashboard (EPA)	DTXSID30893088
- InChI: InChI=1S/C6H14O/c1-3-4-5-6(2)7/h6-7H,3-5H2,1-2H3 Key: QNVRIHYSUZMSGM-UHFFFAOYSA-N; InChI=1/C6H14O/c1-3-4-5-6(2)7/h6-7H,3-5H2,1-2H3 Key: QNVRIHYSUZMSGM-UHFFFAOYAA
- SMILES: OC(C)CCCC

Properties
Chemical formula	C_{6}H_{14}O
Molar mass	102.177 g·mol^{−1}
Density	0.81 g/mL
Melting point	−23 °C (−9 °F; 250 K)
Boiling point	140 °C (284 °F; 413 K)
Solubility in water	14 g/L
Solubility	soluble in ethanol, diethyl ether

Thermochemistry
Std enthalpy of formation (Δ_{f}H^{⦵}_{298})	−392.0 kJ·mol^{−1} (liquid) −333.5 kJ·mol^{−1} (gas)

Hazards
Flash point	45 °C (113 °F; 318 K)
- Except where otherwise noted, data are given for materials in their standard state (at 25 °C [77 °F], 100 kPa). verify (what is ?) Infobox references

2-Hexanol (hexan-2-ol) is a six-carbon alcohol in which the hydroxy group (OH) is located on the second carbon atom. Its chemical formula is C_{6}H_{14}O or C_{6}H_{13}OH. It is an isomer of the other hexanols. 2-Hexanol has a chiral center and can be resolved into two different enantiomers.

Its toxicity is based on metabolism to hexane-2,5-dione.
