= 2-Methyl-2-pentanol =

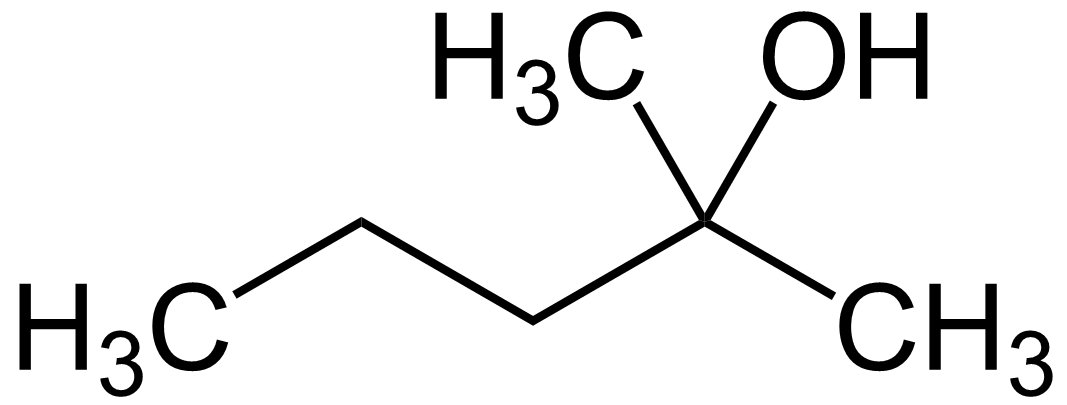
- Structural formula

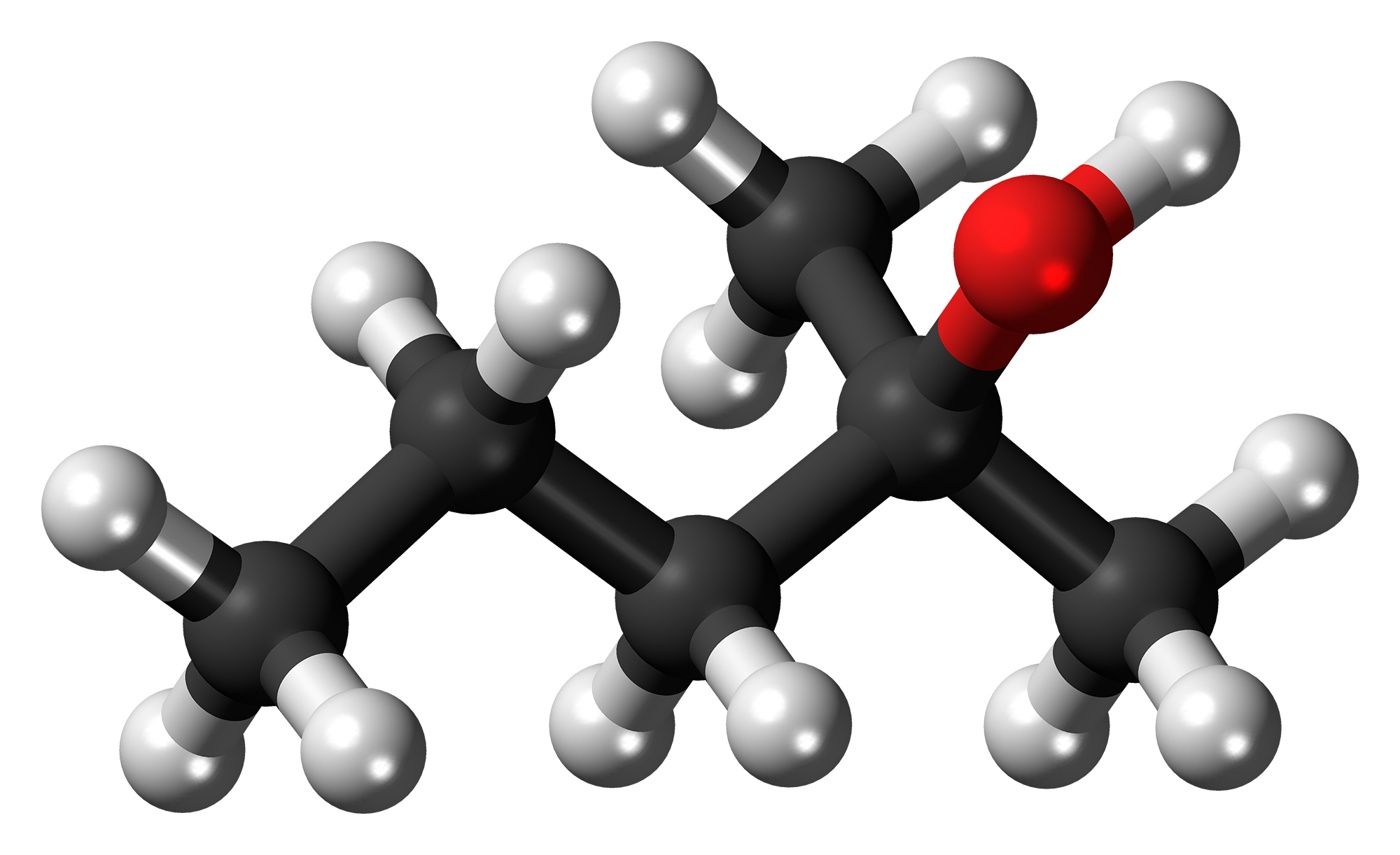
- Ball-and-stick model of 2-methylpentan-2-ol

Names
- Preferred IUPAC name 2-Methylpentan-2-ol
- Other names 2-Methyl-2-pentanol; Dimethyl propyl carbinol Dimethylbutanol

Identifiers
CAS Number	590-36-3
3D model (JSmol)	Interactive image
ChEMBL	ChEMBL450417
ChemSpider	11056
ECHA InfoCard	100.008.802
EC Number	209-681-0
PubChem CID	11543
UNII	HU2SO831KP
UN number	2560
CompTox Dashboard (EPA)	DTXSID4060440
- InChI: InChI=1S/C6H14O/c1-4-5-6(2,3)7/h7H,4-5H2,1-3H3 Key: WFRBDWRZVBPBDO-UHFFFAOYSA-N; InChI=1/C6H14O/c1-4-5-6(2,3)7/h7H,4-5H2,1-3H3 Key: WFRBDWRZVBPBDO-UHFFFAOYAE
- SMILES: OC(C)(C)CCC

Properties
Chemical formula	C_{6}H_{14}O
Molar mass	102.177 g·mol^{−1}
Appearance	Colorless liquid
Density	0.8350 g/cm^{3} at 20 °C
Melting point	−103 °C (−153 °F; 170 K)
Boiling point	121.1 °C (250.0 °F; 394.2 K)
Solubility in water	33 g/L
Solubility	soluble in ethanol, diethyl ether

Hazards
- GHS labelling
Pictograms	(GHS02: Flammable) (GHS07: Exclamation mark)
Signal word	Warning
Hazard statements	H226, H315, H319, H335
Precautionary statements	P210, P233, P240, P241, P242, P243, P261, P264, P271, P280, P302+P352, P303+P361+P353, P304+P340, P305+P351+P338, P312, P321, P332+P313, P337+P313, P362, P370+P378, P403+P233, P403+P235, P405, P501

Related compounds
Related compounds	Hexanol
- Except where otherwise noted, data are given for materials in their standard state (at 25 °C [77 °F], 100 kPa). verify (what is ?) Infobox references

2-Methyl-2-pentanol (IUPAC name: 2-methylpentan-2-ol) is an organic chemical compound. It can be added to a gas chromatograph to help distinguish between branched compounds, especially alcohols. Its presence in urine can be used to test for exposure to 2-methylpentane. As with many other short-chain alcohols, 2-methyl-2-pentanol can produce intoxication and sedative effects similar to those of ethanol, though it is more irritating to mucous membranes and generally more toxic to the body.

== See also ==
- 2-Methyl-2-butanol
- 3-Methyl-3-pentanol
