= 2-Methyl-3-pentanol =

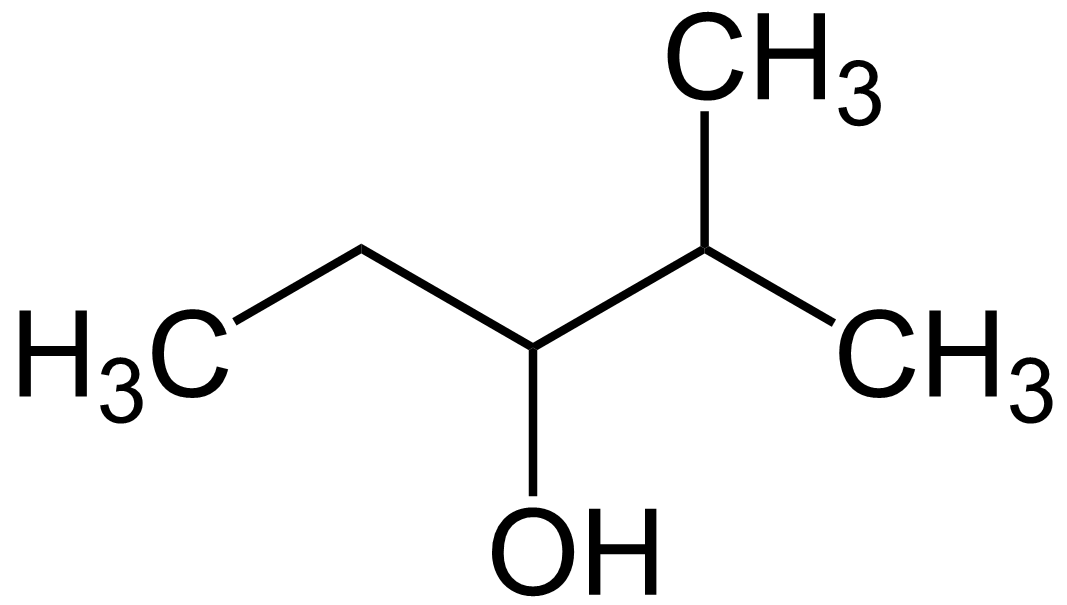

Names
- Preferred IUPAC name 2-Methylpentan-3-ol
- Other names 2-Methyl-3-pentanol; Ethyl isopropyl carbinol

Identifiers
CAS Number	565-67-3=
3D model (JSmol)	Interactive image
ChemSpider	10790
ECHA InfoCard	100.008.443
EC Number	209-286-3
PubChem CID	11264
UNII	PVA5FLE5K2
CompTox Dashboard (EPA)	DTXSID70870616
- InChI: InChI=1S/C6H14O/c1-4-6(7)5(2)3/h5-7H,4H2,1-3H3 Key: ISTJMQSHILQAEC-UHFFFAOYSA-N; InChI=1/C6H14O/c1-4-6(7)5(2)3/h5-7H,4H2,1-3H3 Key: ISTJMQSHILQAEC-UHFFFAOYAF
- SMILES: OC(CC)C(C)C

Properties
Chemical formula	C_{6}H_{14}O
Molar mass	102.174 g/mol
Appearance	colorless liquid
Density	0.8243 g/cm^{3} at 20 °C
Boiling point	126.5 °C (259.7 °F; 399.6 K)
Solubility in water	20 g/L
Solubility	miscible with ethanol, diethyl ether

Thermochemistry
Std enthalpy of formation (Δ_{f}H^{⦵}_{298})	−396.4 kJ·mol^{−1} (liquid)

Hazards
- GHS labelling
Pictograms	(GHS02: Flammable)
Signal word	Warning
Hazard statements	H226
Precautionary statements	P210, P233, P240, P241, P242, P243, P280, P303+P361+P353, P370+P378, P403+P235, P501
- Lethal dose or concentration (LD, LC)
LD_{50} (median dose)	320 mg/kg mouse

Related compounds
Related compounds	Hexanol
- Except where otherwise noted, data are given for materials in their standard state (at 25 °C [77 °F], 100 kPa). verify (what is ?) Infobox references

2-Methyl-3-pentanol (IUPAC name: 2-methylpentan-3-ol) is an organic chemical compound. It is a secondary alcohol that is used as a fuel.
