= 3-Methyl-3-pentanol =

- Structural formula

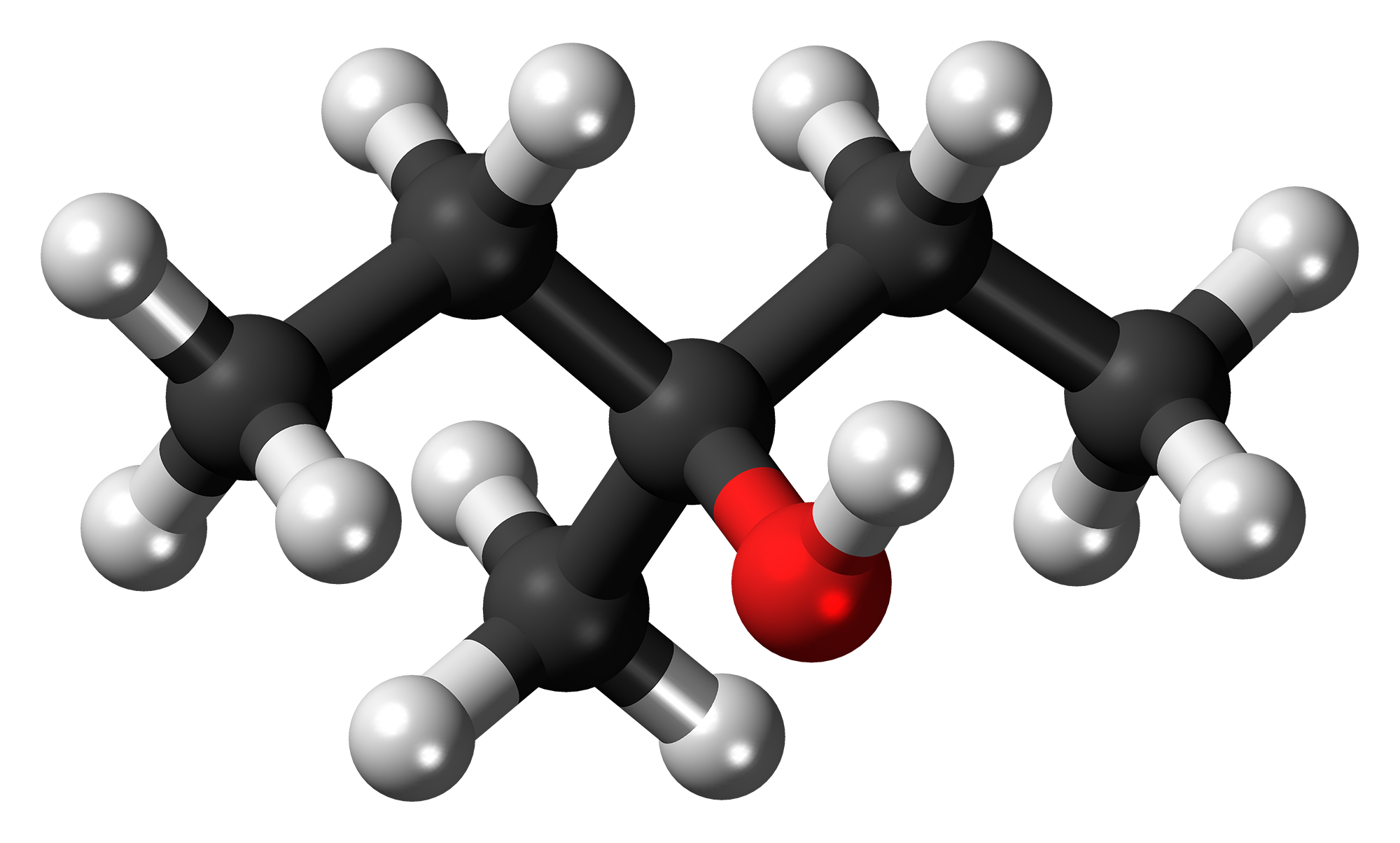
- Ball-and-stick model of 3-methyl-3-pentanol

Names
- Preferred IUPAC name 3-Methylpentan-3-ol
- Other names 3-Methyl-3-pentanol; Diethyl carbinol

Identifiers
CAS Number	77-74-7=
3D model (JSmol)	Interactive image
ChEMBL	ChEMBL506184
ChemSpider	6248
ECHA InfoCard	100.000.959
EC Number	201-053-4
PubChem CID	6493
UNII	SR4551FEKB
CompTox Dashboard (EPA)	DTXSID0021755
- InChI: InChI=1S/C6H14O/c1-4-6(3,7)5-2/h7H,4-5H2,1-3H3 Key: FRDAATYAJDYRNW-UHFFFAOYSA-N; InChI=1/C6H14O/c1-4-6(3,7)5-2/h7H,4-5H2,1-3H3 Key: FRDAATYAJDYRNW-UHFFFAOYAV
- SMILES: OC(C)(CC)CC

Properties
Chemical formula	C_{6}H_{14}O
Molar mass	102.174 g/mol
Appearance	colorless liquid
Odor	fruity
Density	0.8286 g/cm^{3} at 20 °C
Melting point	−23.6 °C (−10.5 °F; 249.6 K)
Boiling point	122.4 °C (252.3 °F; 395.5 K)
Solubility in water	45 g/L
Solubility	miscible with ethanol, diethyl ether

Thermochemistry
Heat capacity (C)	293.4 J·mol^{−1}·K^{−1} (liquid)

Hazards
- GHS labelling
Pictograms	(GHS02: Flammable) (GHS07: Exclamation mark)
Signal word	Warning
Hazard statements	H226, H302
Precautionary statements	P210, P233, P240, P241, P242, P243, P264, P270, P280, P301+P312, P303+P361+P353, P330, P370+P378, P403+P235, P501
- Lethal dose or concentration (LD, LC)
LD_{50} (median dose)	710 mg/kg rat
Safety data sheet (SDS)	http://www.sciencelab.com/msds.php?msdsId=9926087

Related compounds
Related compounds	Hexanol
- Except where otherwise noted, data are given for materials in their standard state (at 25 °C [77 °F], 100 kPa). verify (what is ?) Infobox references

3-Methyl-3-pentanol (IUPAC name: 3-methylpentan-3-ol) is an organic chemical compound and a tertiary hexanol. It is used in the synthesis of the tranquilizer emylcamate, and has similar sedative and anticonvulsant actions itself.

== Synthesis ==
It can be prepared by reacting ethylmagnesium bromide with methyl acetate in the so-called Grignard reaction using dried diethyl ether or tetrahydrofuran as solvent.

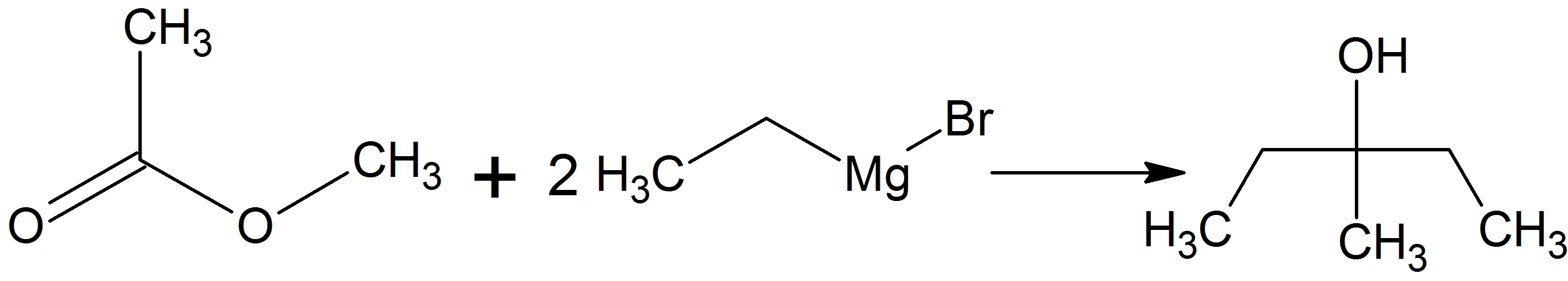
Synthesis of 3-Methyl-3-pentanol

It can be prepared also by reacting ethylmagnesium bromide with butanone in the same conditions already mentioned.
