= 2-Methyl-1-pentanol =

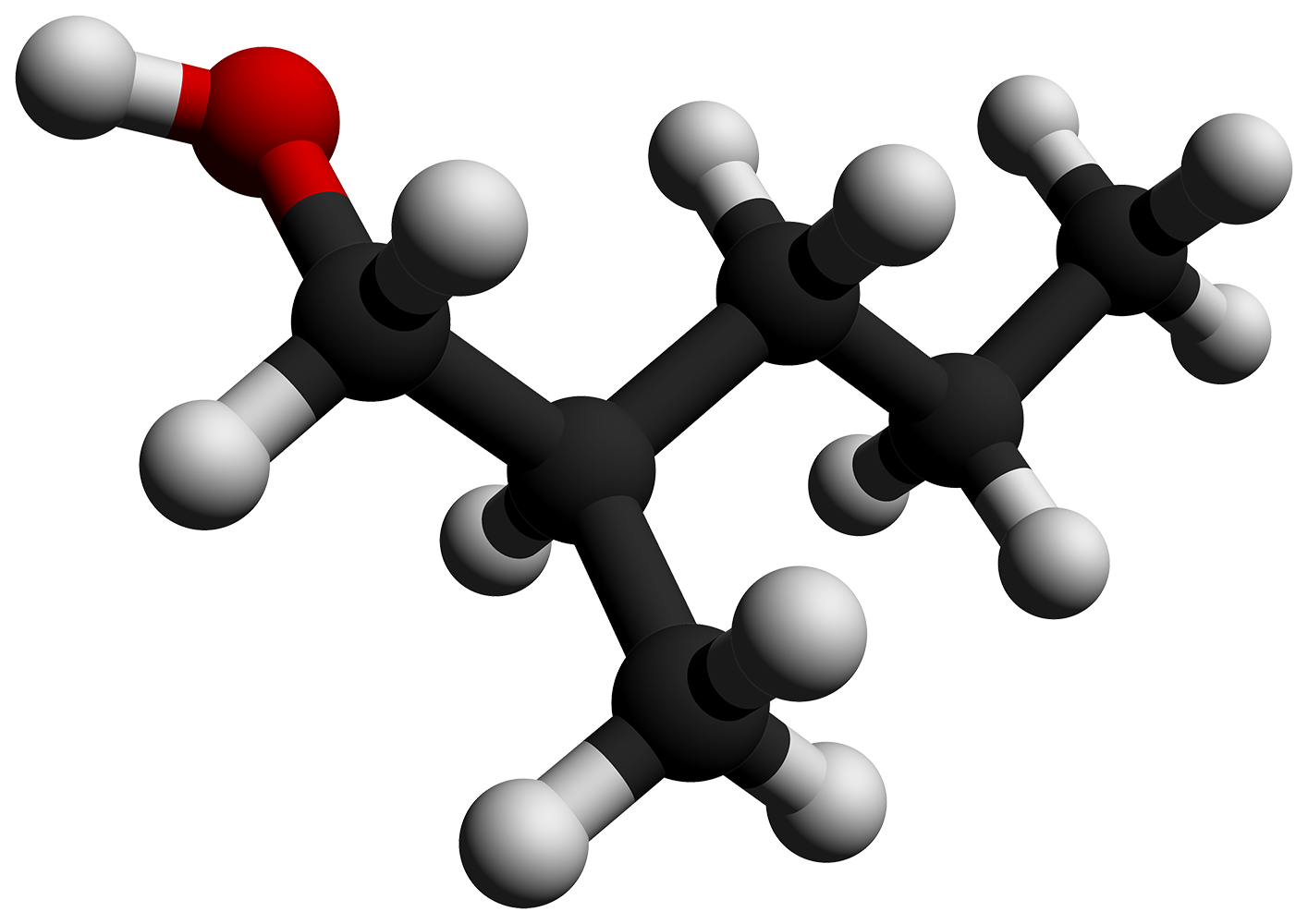

Names
- Preferred IUPAC name 2-Methylpentan-1-ol
- Other names 2-Methyl-1-pentanol

Identifiers
CAS Number	105-30-6
3D model (JSmol)	Interactive image
ChEMBL	(2S): ChEMBL1569610
ChemSpider	7459; (2S): 5367505
ECHA InfoCard	100.002.987
EC Number	203-285-1
PubChem CID	7745
UNII	U8933MB30H
UN number	2053
CompTox Dashboard (EPA)	DTXSID9026714
- InChI: InChI=1S/C6H14O/c1-3-4-6(2)5-7/h6-7H,3-5H2,1-2H3 Key: PFNHSEQQEPMLNI-UHFFFAOYSA-N; InChI=1/C6H14O/c1-3-4-6(2)5-7/h6-7H,3-5H2,1-2H3 Key: PFNHSEQQEPMLNI-UHFFFAOYAK
- SMILES: OCC(C)CCC

Properties
Chemical formula	C_{6}H_{14}O
Molar mass	102.174 g/mol
Appearance	colorless liquid
Density	0.8263 g/cm^{3} at 20 °C
Boiling point	149 °C (300 °F; 422 K)
Solubility in water	8.1 g/L
Solubility	soluble in ethanol, acetone, diethyl ether, carbon tetrachloride
Vapor pressure	0.236 kPa

Thermochemistry
Heat capacity (C)	248.0 J·mol^{−1}·K^{−1} (liquid)

Hazards
- GHS labelling
Pictograms	(GHS02: Flammable) (GHS05: Corrosive) (GHS07: Exclamation mark)
Signal word	Danger
Hazard statements	H226, H302, H315, H318, H319, H335
Precautionary statements	P210, P233, P240, P241, P242, P243, P261, P264, P270, P271, P280, P301+P312, P302+P352, P303+P361+P353, P304+P340, P305+P351+P338, P310, P312, P321, P330, P332+P313, P337+P313, P362, P370+P378, P403+P233, P403+P235, P405, P501
Flash point	54 °C (129 °F; 327 K)
Autoignition temperature	310 °C (590 °F; 583 K)
Explosive limits	1.1 — 9.65%

Related compounds
Related compounds	Hexanol
- Except where otherwise noted, data are given for materials in their standard state (at 25 °C [77 °F], 100 kPa). verify (what is ?) Infobox references

2-Methyl-1-pentanol (IUPAC name: 2-methylpentan-1-ol) is an organic chemical compound. It is used as a solvent and an intermediate in the manufacture of other chemicals. Due to its low solubility in water it has recently been suggested as a solvent in liquid–liquid extraction of ethanol from fermented feedstocks.
