= 3-Methyl-1-pentanol =

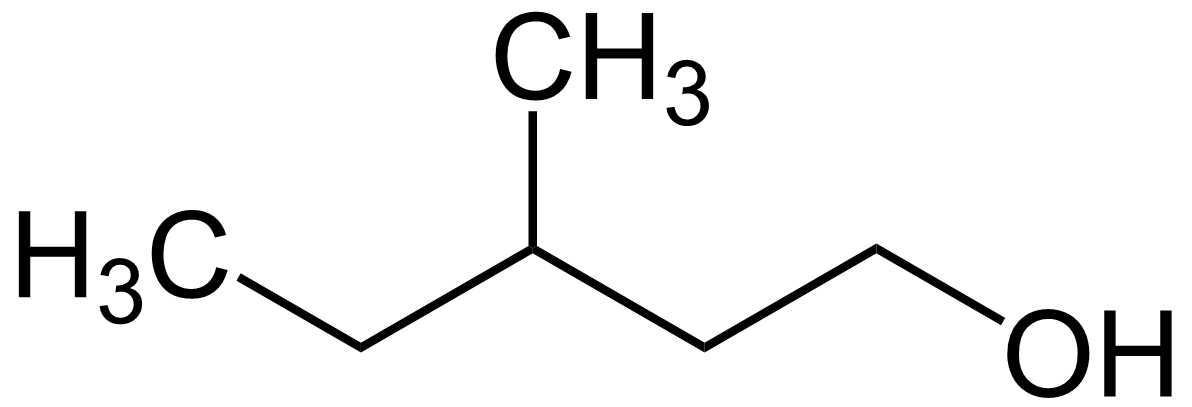

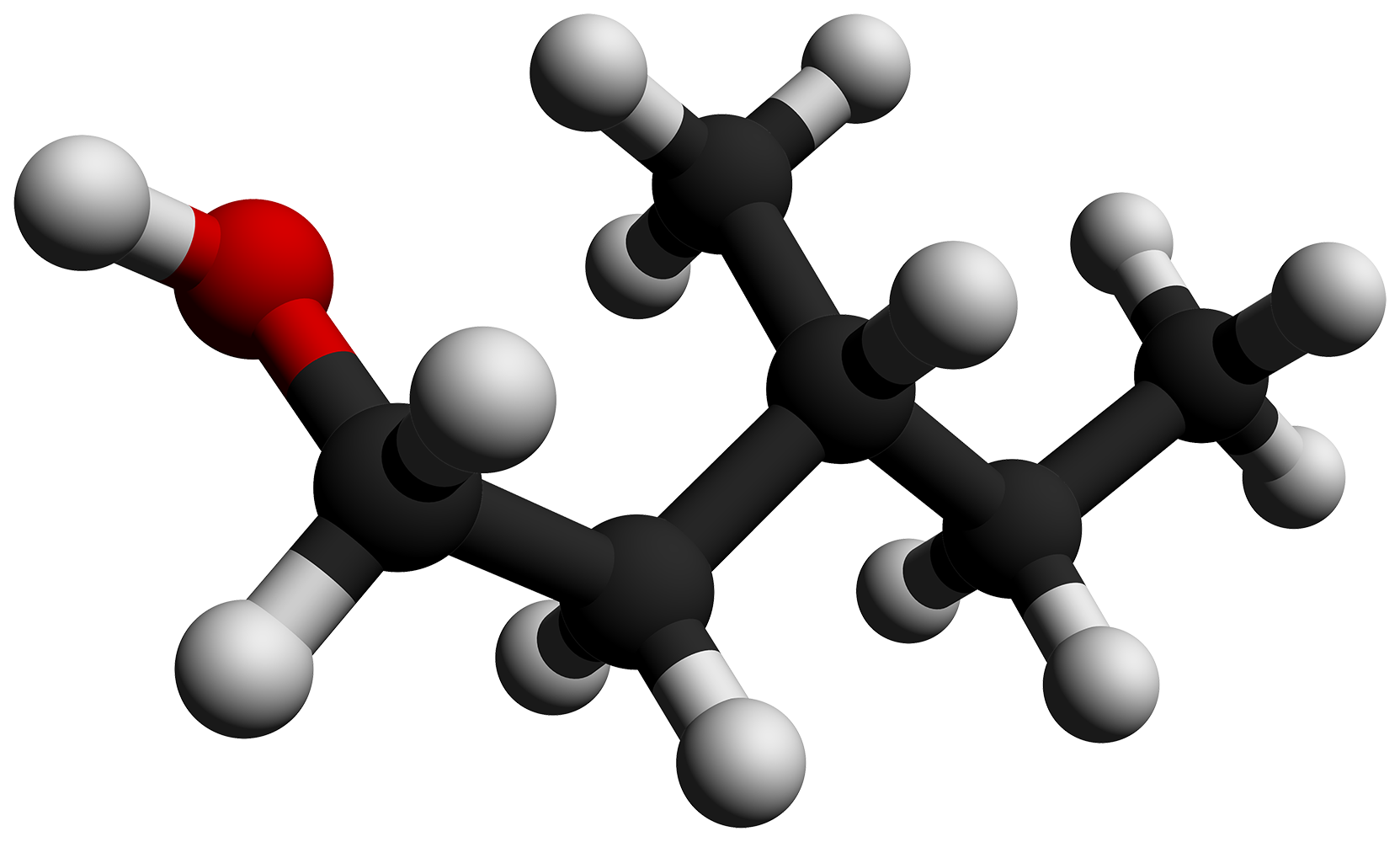

Names
- Preferred IUPAC name 3-Methylpentan-1-ol
- Other names 3-Methyl-1-pentanol

Identifiers
CAS Number	589-35-5
3D model (JSmol)	Interactive image
ChEBI	CHEBI:87381
ChemSpider	11024
ECHA InfoCard	100.008.769
EC Number	209-644-9
PubChem CID	11508
UNII	N8W93SI0FS
CompTox Dashboard (EPA)	DTXSID20862248
- InChI: InChI=1S/C6H14O/c1-3-6(2)4-5-7/h6-7H,3-5H2,1-2H3 Key: IWTBVKIGCDZRPL-UHFFFAOYSA-N; InChI=1/C6H14O/c1-3-6(2)4-5-7/h6-7H,3-5H2,1-2H3 Key: IWTBVKIGCDZRPL-UHFFFAOYAP
- SMILES: OCCC(C)CC

Properties
Chemical formula	C_{6}H_{14}O
Molar mass	102.174 g/mol
Appearance	Colorless liquid
Density	0.8242 g/cm^{3} at 20 °C
Boiling point	153 °C (307 °F; 426 K)
Solubility	Soluble in ethanol, diethyl ether

Hazards
- GHS labelling
Pictograms	(GHS02: Flammable)
Signal word	Warning
Hazard statements	H226
Precautionary statements	P210, P233, P240, P241, P242, P243, P280, P303+P361+P353, P370+P378, P403+P235, P501

Related compounds
Related compounds	Hexanol
- Except where otherwise noted, data are given for materials in their standard state (at 25 °C [77 °F], 100 kPa). verify (what is ?) Infobox references

3-Methyl-1-pentanol (IUPAC name: 3-methylpentan-1-ol) is an organic chemical compound. It occurs naturally in Capsicum frutescens, the tabasco pepper.
