= 2,2-Dimethyl-1-butanol =

- Structural formula of 2,2-Dimethyl-1-butanol

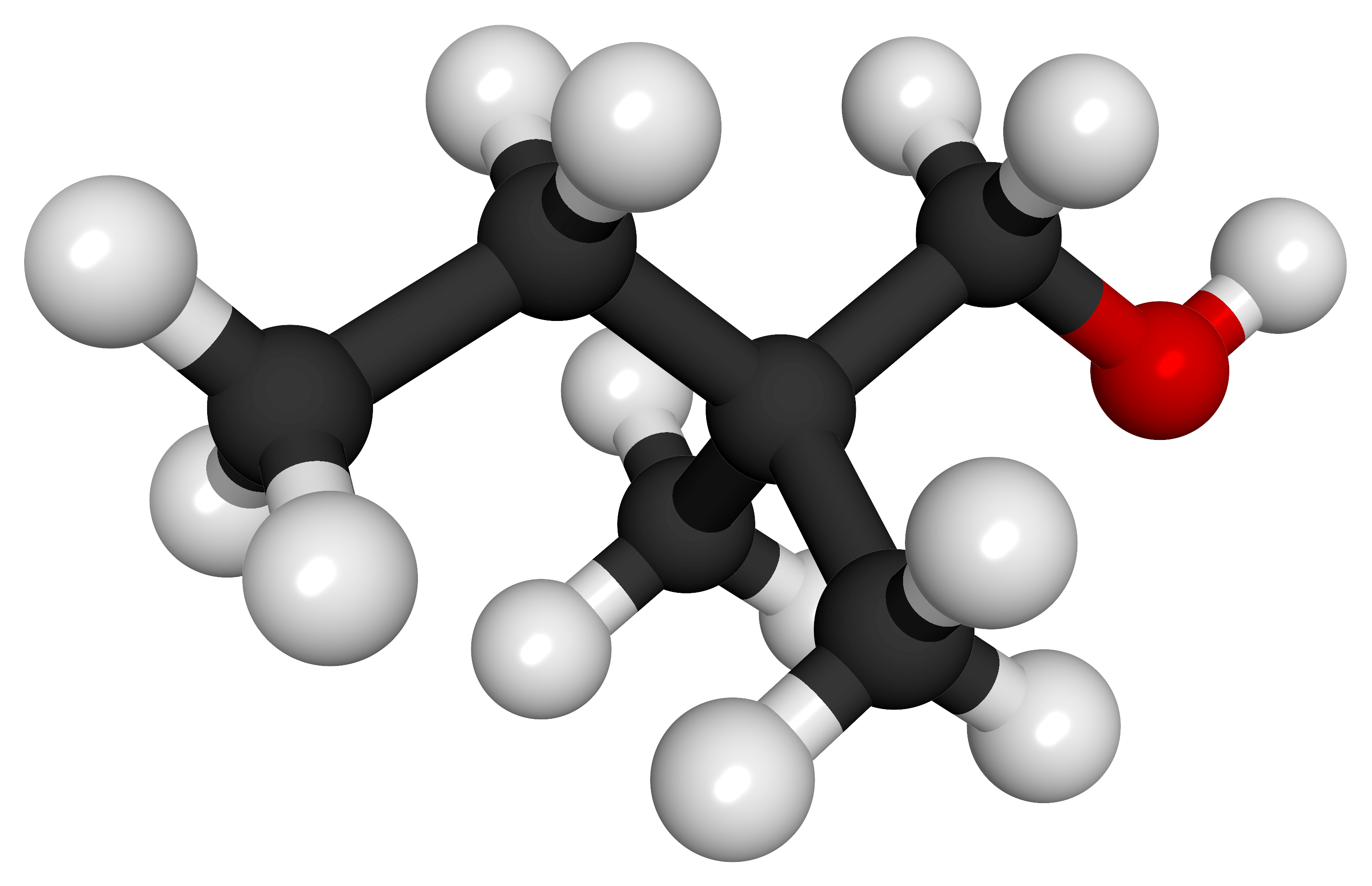
- Ball and stick model of 2,2-Dimethyl-1-butanol

Names
- Preferred IUPAC name 2,2-Dimethylbutan-1-ol
- Other names 2,2-Dimethyl-1-butanol tert-Amylcarbinol; 2,2-Dimethylbutan-1-ol

Identifiers
CAS Number	1185-33-7
3D model (JSmol)	Interactive image
ChemSpider	13801
ECHA InfoCard	100.013.347
EC Number	214-681-9
PubChem CID	14454
UNII	P63ZRN924Q
CompTox Dashboard (EPA)	DTXSID00152139
- InChI: InChI=1S/C6H14O/c1-4-6(2,3)5-7/h7H,4-5H2,1-3H3 Key: XRMVWAKMXZNZIL-UHFFFAOYSA-N; InChI=1/C6H14O/c1-4-6(2,3)5-7/h7H,4-5H2,1-3H3 Key: XRMVWAKMXZNZIL-UHFFFAOYAT
- SMILES: OCC(C)(C)CC

Properties
Chemical formula	C_{6}H_{14}O
Molar mass	102.174 g/mol
Appearance	colorless liquid
Density	0.8283 g/cm^{3} at 20 °C
Melting point	−15 °C (5 °F; 258 K)
Boiling point	136.5 °C (277.7 °F; 409.6 K)
Solubility in water	8 g/L
Solubility	soluble in ethanol, diethyl ether
Vapor pressure	2.78 mmHg
- Except where otherwise noted, data are given for materials in their standard state (at 25 °C [77 °F], 100 kPa). verify (what is ?) Infobox references

2,2-Dimethyl-1-butanol is an organic chemical compound; it is one of the isomeric hexanols. Its main use is as a solvent.
