= 3-Methyl-2-pentanol =

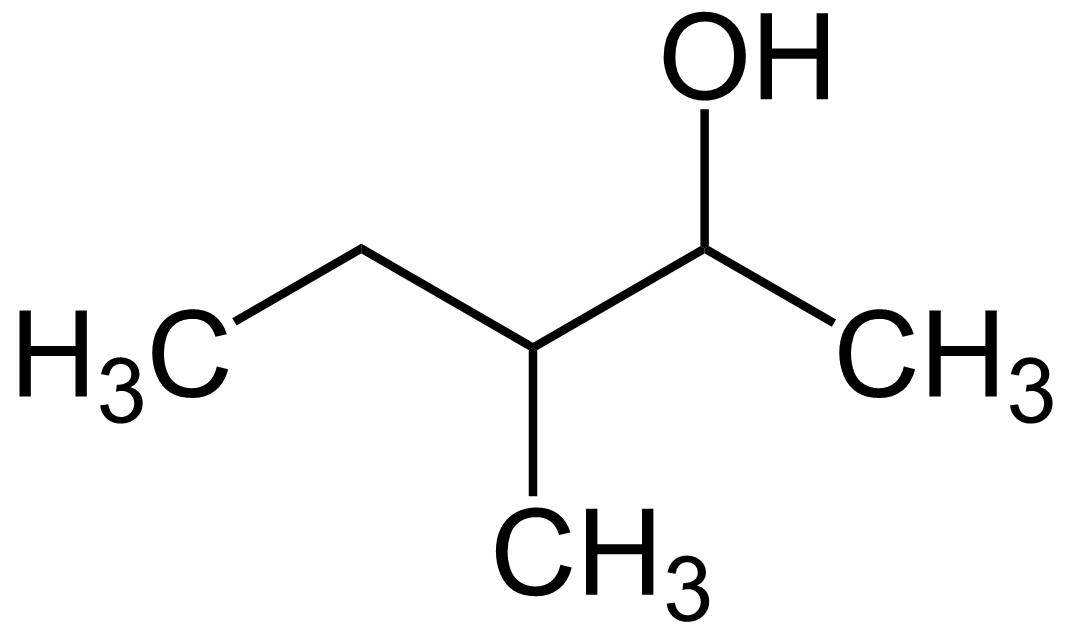

Names
- Preferred IUPAC name 3-Methylpentan-2-ol
- Other names 3-Methyl-2-pentanol

Identifiers
CAS Number	565-60-6
3D model (JSmol)	Interactive image
ChEBI	CHEBI:77520
ChemSpider	10787
ECHA InfoCard	100.008.438
EC Number	209-281-6
PubChem CID	11261
CompTox Dashboard (EPA)	DTXSID80862204
- InChI: InChI=1S/C6H14O/c1-4-5(2)6(3)7/h5-7H,4H2,1-3H3 Key: ZXNBBWHRUSXUFZ-UHFFFAOYSA-N; InChI=1/C6H14O/c1-4-5(2)6(3)7/h5-7H,4H2,1-3H3 Key: ZXNBBWHRUSXUFZ-UHFFFAOYAP
- SMILES: OC(C)C(C)CC

Properties
Chemical formula	C_{6}H_{14}O
Molar mass	102.174 g/mol
Appearance	colorless liquid
Density	0.8307 g/cm^{3} at 20 °C
Boiling point	134.3 °C (273.7 °F; 407.4 K)
Solubility in water	19 g/L
Solubility	soluble in ethanol, diethyl ether

Thermochemistry
Heat capacity (C)	275.9 J·mol^{−1}·K^{−1} (liquid)

Hazards
- GHS labelling
Pictograms	(GHS02: Flammable) (GHS07: Exclamation mark)
Signal word	Warning
Hazard statements	H226, H319
Precautionary statements	P210, P233, P240, P241, P242, P243, P264, P280, P303+P361+P353, P305+P351+P338, P337+P313, P370+P378, P403+P235, P501

Related compounds
Related compounds	Hexanol
- Except where otherwise noted, data are given for materials in their standard state (at 25 °C [77 °F], 100 kPa). verify (what is ?) Infobox references

3-Methyl-2-pentanol (IUPAC name: 3-methylpentan-2-ol) is an organic chemical compound. It has been identified as a component of hops. Its presence in urine can be used to test for exposure to 3-methylpentane.
