= 4-Methyl-2-pentanol =

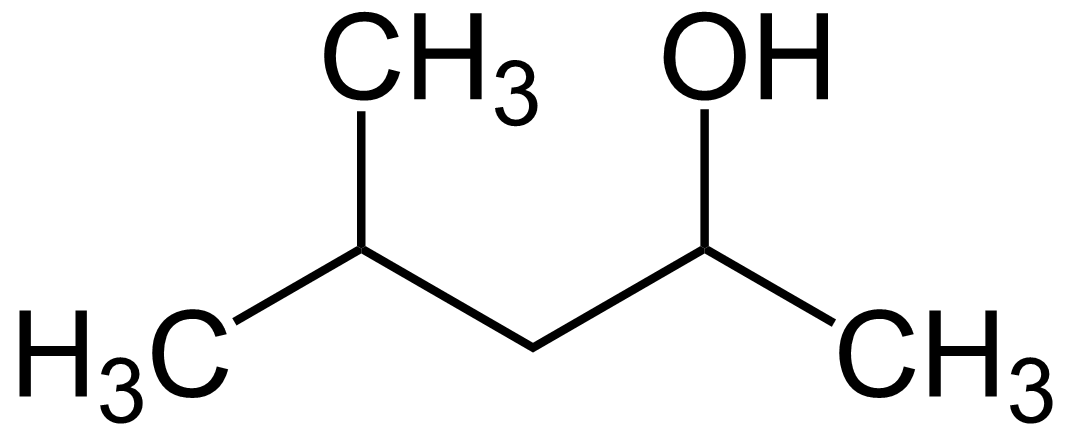

Names
- Preferred IUPAC name 4-Methylpentan-2-ol
- Other names 4-Methyl-2-pentanol; Methyl isobutyl carbinol MIBC; Isobutyl methyl carbinol 2-Methyl-4-pentanol; 4-Methylpentane-2-ol; 1,3-Dimethylbutanol; Methyl amyl alcohol Isobutyl methyl methanol

Identifiers
CAS Number	108-11-2
3D model (JSmol)	Interactive image
ChEMBL	ChEMBL448896
ChemSpider	7622
ECHA InfoCard	100.003.229
EC Number	203-551-7
PubChem CID	7910
RTECS number	SA7350000
UNII	8U34XJK0R0
UN number	2053
CompTox Dashboard (EPA)	DTXSID2026781
- InChI: InChI=1S/C6H14O/c1-5(2)4-6(3)7/h5-7H,4H2,1-3H3 Key: WVYWICLMDOOCFB-UHFFFAOYSA-N; InChI=1/C6H14O/c1-5(2)4-6(3)7/h5-7H,4H2,1-3H3 Key: WVYWICLMDOOCFB-UHFFFAOYAI
- SMILES: OC(C)CC(C)C

Properties
Chemical formula	C_{6}H_{14}O
Molar mass	102.174 g/mol
Appearance	colorless liquid
Odor	mild
Density	0.8075 g/cm^{3} at 20 °C
Melting point	−90 °C (−130 °F; 183 K)
Boiling point	131.6 °C (268.9 °F; 404.8 K)
Solubility in water	15 g/L
Solubility	soluble in ethanol, diethyl ether
Vapor pressure	0.698 kPa
Magnetic susceptibility (χ)	−80.4·10^{−6} cm^{3}/mol
Viscosity	4.07 mPa·s

Thermochemistry
Heat capacity (C)	273.0 J·mol^{−1}·K^{−1} (liquid)
Std enthalpy of formation (Δ_{f}H^{⦵}_{298})	−394.7 kJ·mol^{−1} (liquid)

Hazards
- GHS labelling
Pictograms	(GHS02: Flammable) (GHS07: Exclamation mark)
Signal word	Warning
Hazard statements	H226, H335
Precautionary statements	P210, P233, P240, P241, P242, P243, P261, P271, P280, P303+P361+P353, P304+P340, P312, P370+P378, P403+P233, P403+P235, P405, P501
NFPA 704 (fire diamond)	2 2 0
Flash point	41 °C (106 °F; 314 K)
Explosive limits	1-5.5%
- Lethal dose or concentration (LD, LC)
LD_{50} (median dose)	2590 mg/kg (rat, oral)
LD_{Lo} (lowest published)	1000 mg/kg (mouse, oral)
LC_{50} (median concentration)	2000 ppm (rat, 4 hr)
- NIOSH (US health exposure limits)
PEL (Permissible)	TWA 25 ppm (100 mg/m^{3}) [skin]
REL (Recommended)	TWA 25 ppm (100 mg/m^{3}) ST 40 ppm (165 mg/m^{3}) [skin]
IDLH (Immediate danger)	400 ppm

Related compounds
Related compounds	Hexanol
- Except where otherwise noted, data are given for materials in their standard state (at 25 °C [77 °F], 100 kPa). verify (what is ?) Infobox references

4-Methyl-2-pentanol (IUPAC name: 4-methylpentan-2-ol) or methyl isobutyl carbinol (MIBC) is an organic chemical compound used primarily as a frother in mineral flotation and in the production of lubricant oil additives such as zinc dithiophosphate. It is also used as a solvent, in organic synthesis, and in the manufacture of brake fluid and as a precursor to some plasticizers. It is an acetone derivative in liquid state, with limited solubility in water but generally miscible with most organic solvents.
