= 3-Hexanol =

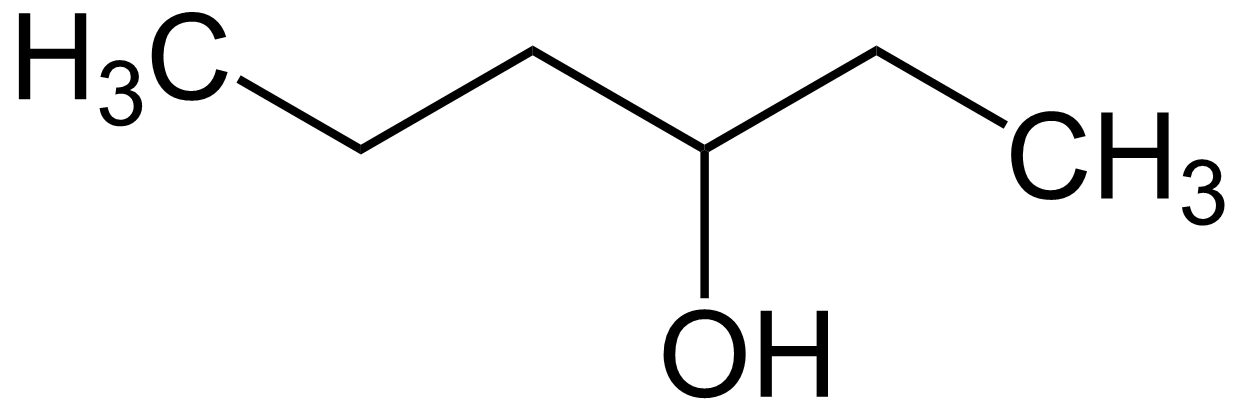

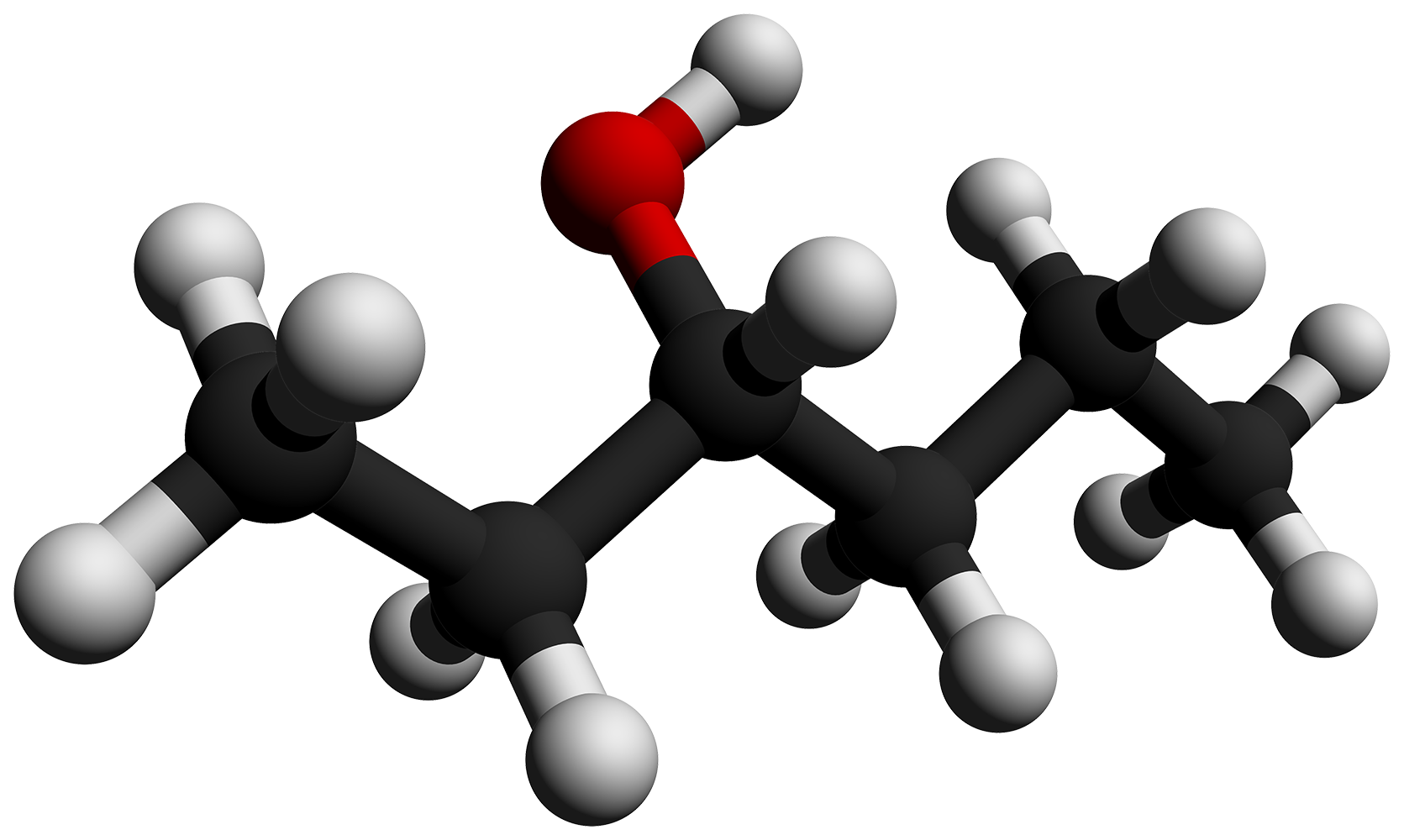

Names
- Preferred IUPAC name Hexan-3-ol
- Other names 3-Hexanol; Ethyl propyl carbinol

Identifiers
CAS Number	623-37-0
3D model (JSmol)	Interactive image
ChEBI	CHEBI:88653
ChEMBL	ChEMBL46678
ChemSpider	11678
ECHA InfoCard	100.009.810
PubChem CID	12178
UNII	I1ZTO95J84
CompTox Dashboard (EPA)	DTXSID70862314
- InChI: InChI=1S/C6H14O/c1-3-5-6(7)4-2/h6-7H,3-5H2,1-2H3 Key: ZOCHHNOQQHDWHG-UHFFFAOYSA-N; InChI=1/C6H14O/c1-3-5-6(7)4-2/h6-7H,3-5H2,1-2H3 Key: ZOCHHNOQQHDWHG-UHFFFAOYAA
- SMILES: CCCC(CC)O

Properties
Chemical formula	C_{6}H_{14}O
Molar mass	102.174 g/mol
Appearance	colorless liquid
Density	0.819 g/cm^{3}
Boiling point	135 °C (275 °F; 408 K)
Solubility in water	16 g/L
Solubility	miscible with diethyl ether; very soluble in ethanol, acetone

Thermochemistry
Heat capacity (C)	286.2 J·mol^{−1}·K^{−1} (liquid)
Std enthalpy of formation (Δ_{f}H^{⦵}_{298})	−392.4 kJ·mol^{−1} (liquid)

Related compounds
Related compounds	Hexanol
- Except where otherwise noted, data are given for materials in their standard state (at 25 °C [77 °F], 100 kPa). verify (what is ?) Infobox references

3-Hexanol (IUPAC name: hexan-3-ol; also called ethyl propyl carbinol) is an organic chemical compound. It occurs naturally in the flavor and aroma of plants such as pineapple and is used as a food additive to add flavor.

== Reactions ==
3-Hexanol can be synthesized by the hydroboration of unsaturated hexane compounds such as 3-hexyne.
