= Isohexanol =

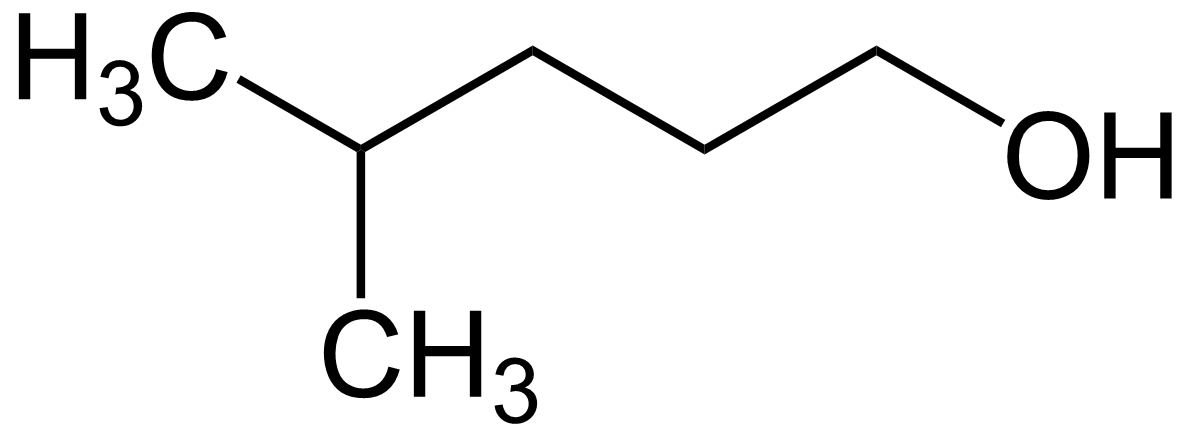

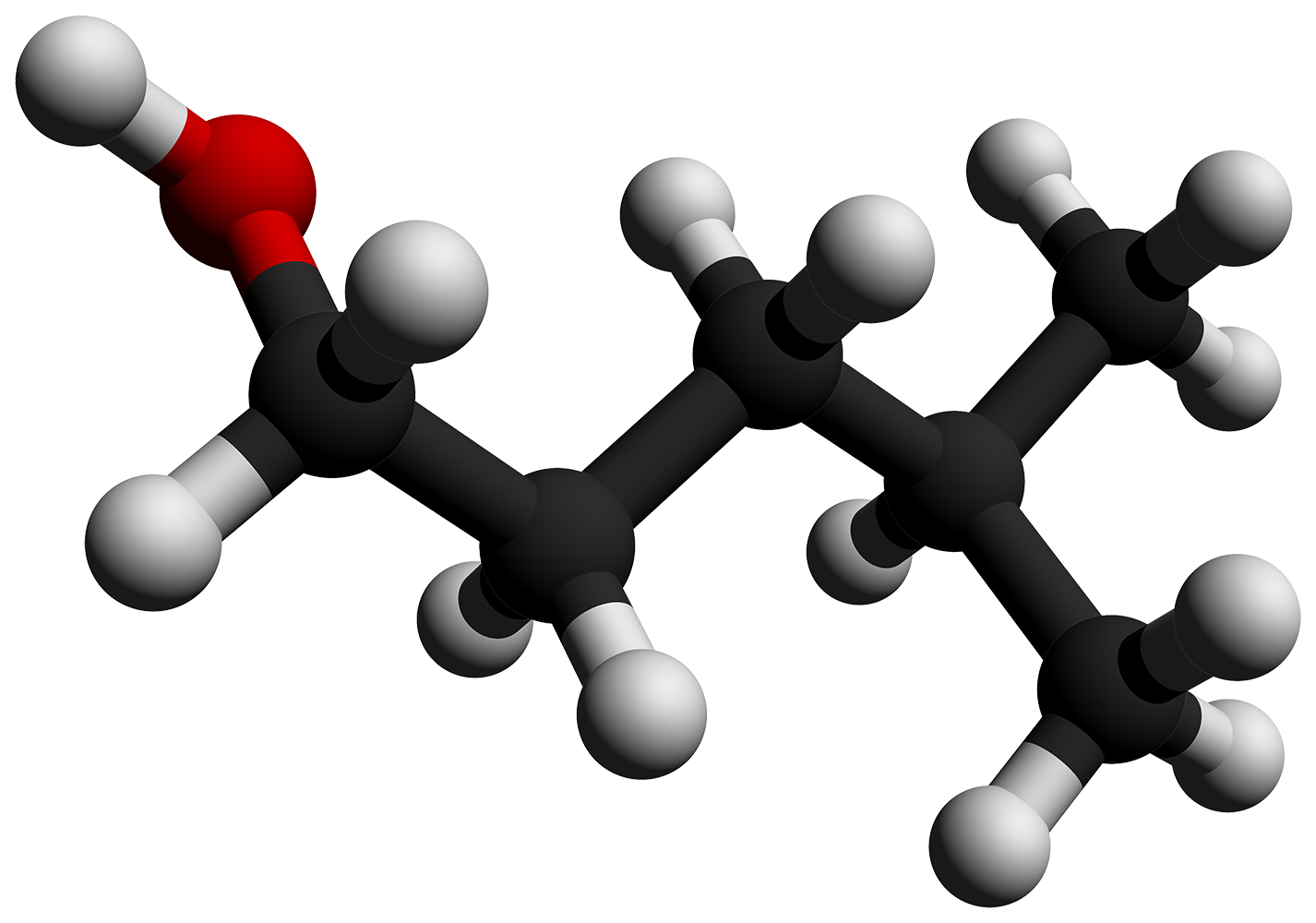

Names
- Preferred IUPAC name 4-Methylpentan-1-ol
- Other names 4-Methyl-1-pentanol; Isohexyl alcohol

Identifiers
CAS Number	626-89-1 =
3D model (JSmol)	Interactive image
Beilstein Reference	1731303
ChEBI	CHEBI:63910
ChEMBL	ChEMBL2260955
ChemSpider	11793
ECHA InfoCard	100.009.973
EC Number	210-969-3
PubChem CID	12296
UNII	X796XFP7D4
CompTox Dashboard (EPA)	DTXSID0044313
- InChI: InChI=1S/C6H14O/c1-6(2)4-3-5-7/h6-7H,3-5H2,1-2H3 Key: PCWGTDULNUVNBN-UHFFFAOYSA-N; InChI=1/C6H14O/c1-6(2)4-3-5-7/h6-7H,3-5H2,1-2H3 Key: PCWGTDULNUVNBN-UHFFFAOYAC
- SMILES: OCCCC(C)C

Properties
Chemical formula	C_{6}H_{14}O
Molar mass	102.174 g/mol
Appearance	colorless liquid
Density	0.8131 g/cm^{3} at 20 °C
Boiling point	151.9 °C (305.4 °F; 425.0 K)
Solubility in water	7.6 g/L
Solubility	soluble in ethanol, diethyl ether

Hazards
- GHS labelling
Pictograms	(GHS02: Flammable) (GHS06: Toxic) (GHS07: Exclamation mark)
Signal word	Danger
Hazard statements	H226, H302, H311, H331
Precautionary statements	P210, P233, P240, P241, P242, P243, P261, P264, P270, P271, P280, P301+P312, P302+P352, P303+P361+P353, P304+P340, P311, P312, P321, P322, P330, P361, P363, P370+P378, P403+P233, P403+P235, P405, P501

Related compounds
Related compounds	Hexanol
- Except where otherwise noted, data are given for materials in their standard state (at 25 °C [77 °F], 100 kPa). verify (what is ?) Infobox references

Isohexanol (IUPAC name: 4-methylpentan-1-ol; also called isohexyl alcohol or 4-methyl-1-pentanol) is an organic chemical compound. It is found in longan fruit.
