= Alcohol (chemistry) =

Class of organic compounds

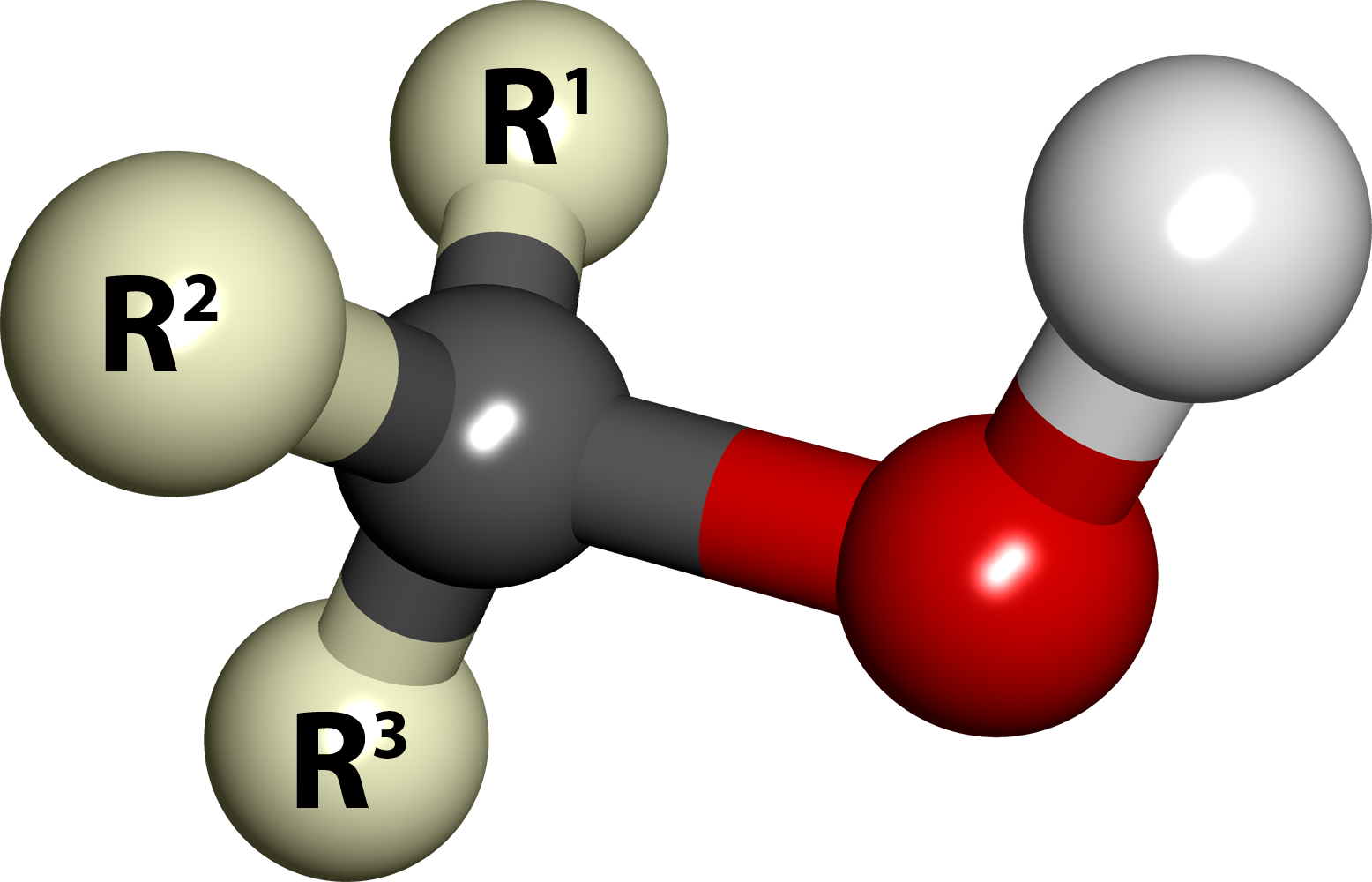
Ball-and-stick model of an alcohol molecule (R_{3}COH). The red and white balls represent the hydroxyl group (−OH). The three "R"s stand for carbon substituents or hydrogen atoms.

In chemistry, an alcohol (from Arabic al-kuḥl 'the kohl') is a type of organic compound that carries at least one hydroxyl (−OH) functional group bound to a saturated carbon atom. Alcohols range from the simple, like methanol and ethanol, to complex, like sugar alcohols and cholesterol. The presence of an OH group strongly modifies the properties of hydrocarbons, conferring hydrophilic (water-attracted) properties. The OH group provides a site at which many reactions can occur.

== History ==
The flammable nature of the exhalations of wine was already known to ancient natural philosophers such as Aristotle (384–322 BCE), Theophrastus (c. 371–287 BCE), and Pliny the Elder (23/24–79 CE). However, this did not immediately lead to the isolation of alcohol, even despite the development of more advanced distillation techniques in second- and third-century Roman Egypt. An important recognition, first found in one of the writings attributed to Jābir ibn Ḥayyān (ninth century CE), was that by adding salt to boiling wine, which increases the wine's relative volatility, the flammability of the resulting vapors may be enhanced. The distillation of wine is attested in Arabic works attributed to al-Kindī (c. 801–873 CE) and to al-Fārābī (c. 872–950), and in the 28th book of al-Zahrāwī's (Latin: Abulcasis, 936–1013) Kitāb al-Taṣrīf (later translated into Latin as Liber servatoris). In the twelfth century, recipes for the production of aqua ardens ("burning water", i.e., alcohol) by distilling wine with salt started to appear in a number of Latin works, and by the end of the thirteenth century, it had become a widely known substance among Western European chemists.

The works of Taddeo Alderotti (1223–1296) describe a method for concentrating alcohol involving repeated fractional distillation through a water-cooled still, by which an alcohol purity of 90% could be obtained. The medicinal properties of ethanol were studied by Arnald of Villanova (1240–1311 CE) and John of Rupescissa (c. 1310–1366), the latter of whom regarded it as a life-preserving substance able to prevent all diseases (the aqua vitae or "water of life", also called by John the quintessence of wine).

== Nomenclature ==
=== Etymology ===
The word "alcohol" derives from the Arabic kohl (Arabic: الكحل, romanized: al-kuḥl), a powder used as an eyeliner. The first part of the word (al-) is the Arabic definite article, equivalent to the in English. The second part of the word (kuḥl) has several antecedents in Semitic languages, ultimately deriving from the Akkadian 𒎎𒋆𒁉𒍣𒁕 (guḫlum), meaning stibnite or antimony.

Like its antecedents in Arabic and older languages, the term alcohol was originally used for the very fine powder produced by the sublimation of the natural mineral stibnite to form antimony trisulfide Sb_{2}S_{3}. It was considered to be the essence or "spirit" of this mineral. It was used as an antiseptic, eyeliner, and cosmetic. Later the meaning of alcohol was extended to distilled substances in general, and then narrowed again to ethanol, when "spirits" was a synonym for hard liquor.

Paracelsus and Libavius both used the term alcohol to denote a fine powder, the latter speaking of an alcohol derived from antimony. At the same time Paracelsus uses the word for a volatile liquid; alcool or alcool vini occurs often in his writings.

Bartholomew Traheron, in his 1543 translation of John of Vigo, introduces the word as a term used by "barbarous" authors for "fine powder." Vigo wrote: "the barbarous auctours use alcohol, or (as I fynde it sometymes wryten) alcofoll, for moost fine poudre."

The 1657 Lexicon Chymicum by William Johnson glosses the word as "antimonium sive stibium." By extension, the word came to refer to any fluid obtained by distillation, including "alcohol of wine," the distilled essence of wine. Libavius in Alchymia (1594) refers to "vini alcohol vel vinum alcalisatum". Johnson (1657) glosses alcohol vini as "quando omnis superfluitas vini a vino separatur, ita ut accensum ardeat donec totum consumatur, nihilque fæcum aut phlegmatis in fundo remaneat." The word's meaning became restricted to "spirit of wine" (the chemical known today as ethanol) in the 18th century and was extended to the class of substances so-called as "alcohols" in modern chemistry after 1850.

The term ethanol was invented in 1892, blending "ethane" with the "-ol" ending of "alcohol", which was generalized as a libfix.

The term alcohol originally referred to the primary alcohol ethanol (ethyl alcohol), which is used as a drug and is the main alcohol present in alcoholic drinks.

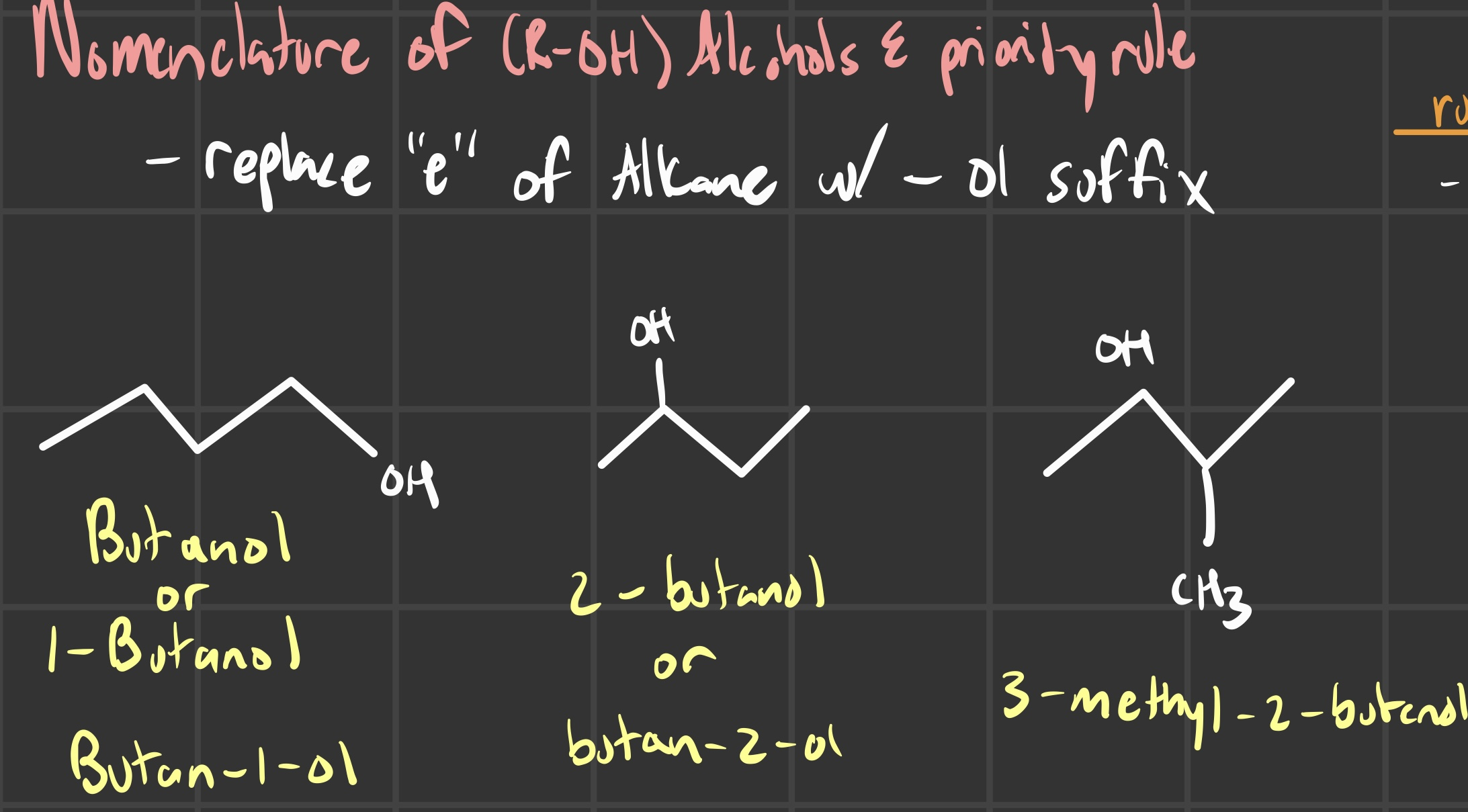

The suffix -ol appears in the International Union of Pure and Applied Chemistry (IUPAC) chemical name of all substances where the hydroxyl group is the functional group with the highest priority. When a higher priority group is present in the compound, the prefix hydroxy- is used in its IUPAC name. The suffix -ol in non-IUPAC names (such as paracetamol or cholesterol) also typically indicates that the substance is an alcohol. However, some compounds that contain hydroxyl functional groups have trivial names that do not include the suffix -ol or the prefix hydroxy-, e.g. the sugars glucose and sucrose.

=== Systematic names ===
IUPAC nomenclature is used in scientific publications, and in writings where precise identification of the substance is important. In naming simple alcohols, the name of the alkane chain loses the terminal e and adds the suffix -ol, e.g., as in "ethanol" from the alkane chain name "ethane". When necessary, the position of the hydroxyl group is indicated by a number between the alkane name and the -ol: propan-1-ol for CH_{3}CH_{2}CH_{2}OH, propan-2-ol for CH_{3}CH(OH)CH_{3}. If a higher priority group is present (such as an aldehyde, ketone, or carboxylic acid), then the prefix hydroxy-is used, e.g., as in 1-hydroxy-2-propanone (CH_{3}C(O)CH_{2}OH). Compounds having more than one hydroxy group are called polyols. They are named using suffixes -diol, -triol, etc., following a list of the position numbers of the hydroxyl groups, as in propane-1,2-diol for CH_{3}CH(OH)CH_{2}OH (propylene glycol).

Example alcohols and representations
Structural formula	Skeletal formula	Preferred IUPAC name	Other systematic names	Common names	Degree
CH_{3}−CH_{2}−CH_{2}−OH		propan-1-ol	1-propanol; n-propyl alcohol	propanol	primary
		propan-2-ol	2-propanol	isopropyl alcohol; isopropanol	secondary
		cyclohexanol			secondary
		2-methylpropan-1-ol	2-methyl-1-propanol	isobutyl alcohol; isobutanol	primary
		tert-amyl alcohol	2-methylbutan-2-ol; 2-methyl-2-butanol	TAA	tertiary

In cases where the hydroxy group is bonded to an sp^{2} carbon on an aromatic ring, the molecule is classified separately as a phenol and is named using the IUPAC rules for naming phenols. Phenols have distinct properties and are not classified as alcohols.

=== Common names ===
In other less formal contexts, an alcohol is often called with the name of the corresponding alkyl group followed by the word "alcohol", e.g., methyl alcohol, ethyl alcohol. Propyl alcohol may be n-propyl alcohol or isopropyl alcohol, depending on whether the hydroxyl group is bonded to the end or middle carbon on the straight propane chain. As described under systematic naming, if another group on the molecule takes priority, the alcohol moiety is often indicated using the "hydroxy-" prefix.

In archaic nomenclature, alcohols can be named as derivatives of methanol using "-carbinol" as the ending. For instance, (CH_{3})_{3}COH can be named trimethylcarbinol.

==== Primary, secondary, and tertiary ====
Alcohols are then classified into primary, secondary (sec-, s-), and tertiary (tert-, t-), based upon the number of carbon atoms connected to the carbon atom that bears the hydroxyl functional group. The respective numeric shorthands 1°, 2°, and 3° are sometimes used in informal settings. The primary alcohols have general formulas RCH_{2}OH. The simplest primary alcohol is methanol (CH_{3}OH), for which R = H, and the next is ethanol, for which R = CH_{3}, the methyl group. Secondary alcohols are those of the form RR'CHOH, the simplest of which is 2-propanol (R = R' = CH_{3}). For the tertiary alcohols, the general form is RR'R"COH. The simplest example is tert-butanol (2-methylpropan-2-ol), for which each of R, R', and R" is CH_{3}. In these shorthands, R, R', and R" represent substituents, alkyl or other attached, generally organic groups.

== Examples ==
Type	Formula	IUPAC Name	Common name
Monohydric alcohols	CH_{3}OH	Methanol	Wood alcohol
Monohydric alcohols	C_{2}H_{5}OH	Ethanol	Alcohol, Rubbing alcohol
Monohydric alcohols	C_{3}H_{7}OH	Propan-2-ol	Isopropyl alcohol, Rubbing alcohol
Monohydric alcohols	C_{4}H_{9}OH	Butan-1-ol	Butanol, Butyl alcohol
Monohydric alcohols	C_{5}H_{11}OH	Pentan-1-ol	Pentanol, Amyl alcohol
Monohydric alcohols	C_{16}H_{33}OH	Hexadecan-1-ol	Cetyl alcohol
Polyhydric alcohols (sugar alcohols)	C_{2}H_{4}(OH)_{2}	Ethane-1,2-diol	Ethylene glycol
Polyhydric alcohols (sugar alcohols)	C_{3}H_{6}(OH)_{2}	Propane-1,2-diol	Propylene glycol
Polyhydric alcohols (sugar alcohols)	C_{3}H_{5}(OH)_{3}	Propane-1,2,3-triol	Glycerol
Polyhydric alcohols (sugar alcohols)	C_{4}H_{6}(OH)_{4}	Butane-1,2,3,4-tetraol	Erythritol, Threitol
Polyhydric alcohols (sugar alcohols)	C_{5}H_{7}(OH)_{5}	Pentane-1,2,3,4,5-pentol	Xylitol
Polyhydric alcohols (sugar alcohols)	C_{6}H_{8}(OH)_{6}	hexane-1,2,3,4,5,6-hexol	Mannitol, Sorbitol
Polyhydric alcohols (sugar alcohols)	C_{7}H_{9}(OH)_{7}	Heptane-1,2,3,4,5,6,7-heptol	Volemitol
Unsaturated aliphatic alcohols	C_{3}H_{5}OH	Prop-2-ene-1-ol	Allyl alcohol
Unsaturated aliphatic alcohols	C_{10}H_{17}OH	3,7-Dimethylocta-2,6-dien-1-ol	Geraniol
Unsaturated aliphatic alcohols	C_{3}H_{3}OH	Prop-2-yn-1-ol	Propargyl alcohol
Alicyclic alcohols	C_{6}H_{6}(OH)_{6}	Cyclohexane-1,2,3,4,5,6-hexol	Inositol
Alicyclic alcohols	C_{10}H_{19}OH	5-Methyl-2-(propan-2-yl)cyclohexan-1-ol	Menthol

== Applications ==
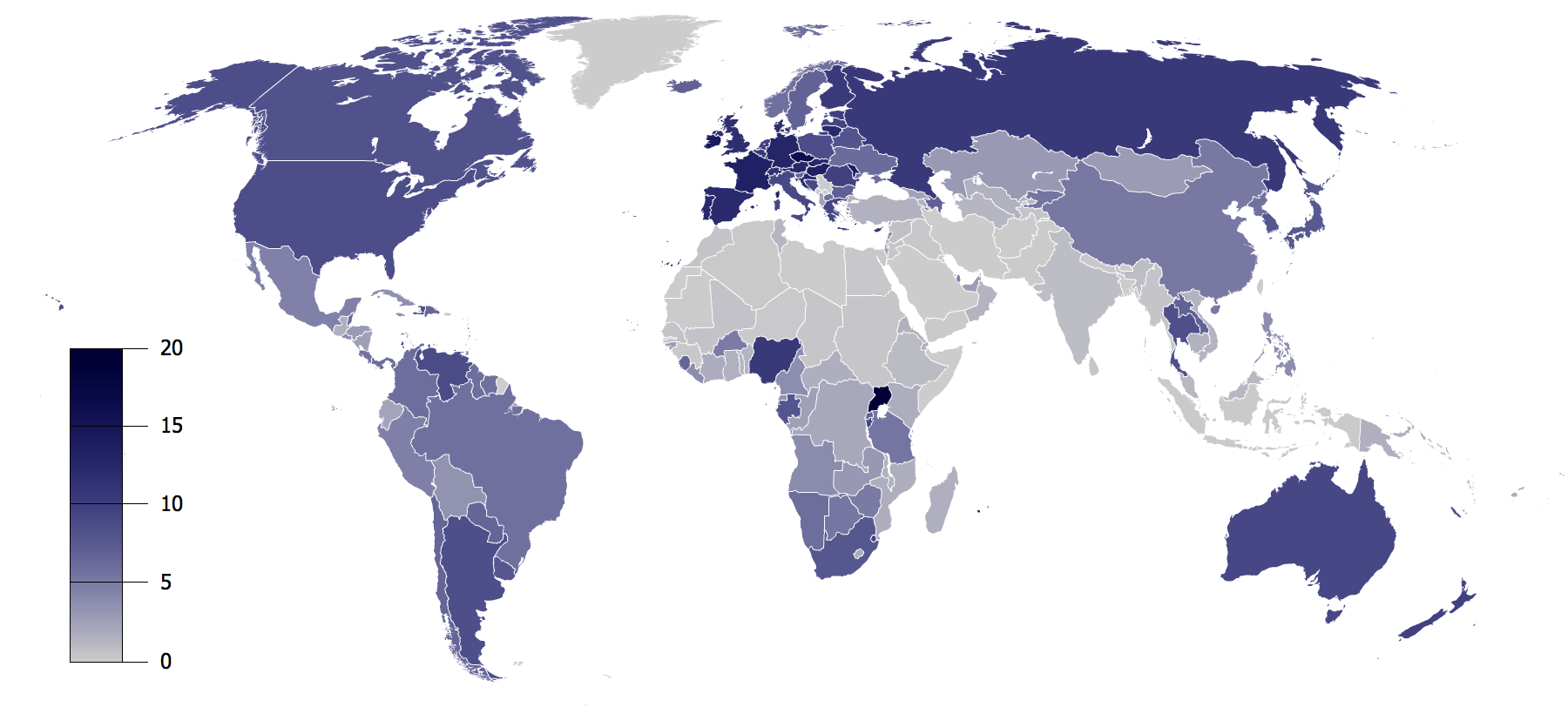
Total recorded alcohol per capita consumption (15+) per year, in litres of pure ethanol

Alcohols have a long history of myriad uses. For simple mono-alcohols, which are the focus of this article, the following are most important industrial alcohols:

- methanol, mainly for the production of formaldehyde and as a fuel additive
- ethanol, mainly for alcoholic beverages, fuel additive, solvent, and to sterilize hospital instruments.
- 1-propanol, 1-butanol, and isobutyl alcohol for use as a solvent and precursor to solvents
- C6–C11 alcohols used for plasticizers, e.g. in polyvinylchloride
- fatty alcohol (C12–C18), precursors to detergents

Methanol is the most common industrial alcohol, with about 12 million tons/y produced in 1980. The combined capacity of the other alcohols is about the same, distributed roughly equally.

== Toxicity ==
With respect to acute toxicity, simple alcohols have low acute toxicities. Doses of several milliliters are tolerated. For pentanols, hexanols, octanols, and longer alcohols, LD_{50} range from 2–5 g/kg (rats, oral). Ethanol is less acutely toxic. All alcohols are mild skin irritants.

Methanol and ethylene glycol are more toxic than other simple alcohols. Their metabolism is affected by the presence of ethanol, which has a higher affinity for liver alcohol dehydrogenase. In this way, methanol will be excreted intact in urine.

== Physical properties ==
In general, the hydroxyl group makes alcohols polar. Those groups can form hydrogen bonds to one another and to most other compounds. Owing to the presence of the polar OH alcohols are more water-soluble than simple hydrocarbons. Methanol, ethanol, and propanol are miscible in water. 1-Butanol, with a four-carbon chain, is moderately soluble.

Because of hydrogen bonding, alcohols tend to have higher boiling points than comparable hydrocarbons and ethers. The boiling point of the alcohol ethanol is 78.29 °C, compared to 69 °C for the hydrocarbon hexane, and 34.6 °C for diethyl ether.

== Occurrence in nature ==
Alcohols occur widely in nature, as derivatives of glucose such as cellulose and hemicellulose, and in phenols and their derivatives such as lignin. Starting from biomass, 180 billion tons/y of complex carbohydrates (sugar polymers) are produced commercially (as of 2014). Many other alcohols are pervasive in organisms, as manifested in other sugars such as fructose and sucrose, in polyols such as glycerol, and in some amino acids such as serine. Simple alcohols like methanol, ethanol, and propanol occur in modest quantities in nature, and are industrially synthesized in large quantities for use as chemical precursors, fuels, and solvents.

== Production ==
=== Hydroxylation ===
Many alcohols are produced by hydroxylation, i.e., the installation of a hydroxy group using oxygen or a related oxidant. Hydroxylation is the means by which the body processes many poisons, converting lipophilic compounds into hydrophilic derivatives that are more readily excreted. Enzymes called hydroxylases and oxidases facilitate these conversions.

Many industrial alcohols, such as cyclohexanol for the production of nylon, are produced by hydroxylation.

=== Ziegler and oxo processes ===
In the Ziegler process, linear alcohols are produced from ethylene and triethylaluminium followed by oxidation and hydrolysis. An idealized synthesis of 1-octanol is shown:

Al(C_{2}H_{5})_{3} + 9 C_{2}H_{4} → Al(C_{8}H_{17})_{3}
Al(C_{8}H_{17})_{3} + 3O + 3 H_{2}O → 3 HOC_{8}H_{17} + Al(OH)_{3}

The process generates a range of alcohols that are separated by distillation.

Many higher alcohols are produced by hydroformylation of alkenes followed by hydrogenation. When applied to a terminal alkene, as is common, one typically obtains a linear alcohol:

RCH=CH_{2} + H_{2} + CO → RCH_{2}CH_{2}CHO
RCH_{2}CH_{2}CHO + H_{2} → RCH_{2}CH_{2}CH_{2}OH

Such processes give fatty alcohols, which are useful for detergents.

=== Hydration reactions ===
Industry produces low-weight molecular alcohols (e.g. ethanol, isopropanol, 2-butanol, and tert-butanol) through the acid-catalyzed hydration of alkenes, the latter typically from cracking fractions of distilled crude oil. Two implementations are employed: the direct and indirect methods. In the indirect method, the alkene is converted to a sulfate ester, which is subsequently hydrolyzed. The direct method eschews intermediates, instead using water to quench an intermediate carbocation.

Less aggressive reagents suffice for vicinal difunctionalization. In industry, the diol ethylene glycol forms when ethylene oxide is hydrolyzed.

In the laboratory, sulfuric acid also catalyzes hydration of alkenes to secondary or tertiary alcohols. More controllable net hydrations proceed in multiple steps, with a vicinally-functionalized intermediate. Thus oxymercuration initially forms an organomercury alcohol, which can then undergo reductive demetalation; and alkenes react with N-bromosuccinimide and water to form halohydrins. In hydroboration-oxidation and the related Mukaiyama hydration, an alkene is hydrometalated, then oxidized.

=== Fermentation ===
Ethanol is obtained by fermentation of glucose (which is often obtained from starch) in the presence of yeast. Carbon dioxide is cogenerated. Like ethanol, butanol can be produced by fermentation processes. Saccharomyces yeast are known to produce these higher alcohols at temperatures above 75 °F (24 °C). The bacterium Clostridium acetobutylicum can feed on cellulose (also an alcohol) to produce butanol on an industrial scale.

=== Substitution ===
Primary alkyl halides react with aqueous NaOH or KOH to give alcohols in nucleophilic aliphatic substitution. Secondary and especially tertiary alkyl halides will give the elimination (alkene) product instead. Grignard reagents react with carbonyl groups to give secondary and tertiary alcohols. Related reactions are the Barbier reaction and the Nozaki–Hiyama–Kishi reaction.

=== Reduction ===
Aldehydes or ketones are reduced with sodium borohydride or lithium aluminium hydride (after an acidic workup). Another reduction using aluminium isopropoxide is the Meerwein–Ponndorf–Verley reduction. Noyori asymmetric hydrogenation is the asymmetric reduction of β-keto-esters.

== Reactions ==
=== Deprotonation ===
With aqueous pK_{a} values of around 16–19, alcohols are, in general, slightly weaker acids than water. With strong bases such as sodium hydride or sodium they form salts (Note: Although commonly described as "salts", alkali metal alkoxides are actually better described structurally as oligomeric clusters or polymeric chains. For instance, potassium tert-butoxide consists of a cubane-like tetramer, [t-BuOK]_{4}, that persists even in polar solvents like THF.) called alkoxides, with the general formula RO^{−}M^{+} (where R is an alkyl and M is a metal).

R−OH + NaH → R−O^{−}Na^{+} + H_{2}
2 R−OH + 2 Na → 2 R−O^{−}Na^{+} + H_{2}

The acidity of alcohols is strongly affected by solvation. In the gas phase, alcohols are more acidic than in water. In DMSO, alcohols (and water) have a pK_{a} of around 29–32. As a consequence, alkoxides (and hydroxide) are powerful bases and nucleophiles (e.g., for the Williamson ether synthesis) in this solvent. In particular, RO^{−} or HO^{−} in DMSO can be used to generate significant equilibrium concentrations of acetylide ions through the deprotonation of alkynes (see Favorskii reaction).

=== Nucleophilic substitution ===
Tertiary alcohols react with hydrochloric acid to produce tertiary alkyl chloride. Primary and secondary alcohols are converted to the corresponding chlorides using thionyl chloride and various phosphorus chloride reagents.

Primary and secondary alcohols, likewise, convert to alkyl bromides using phosphorus tribromide, for example:

3 R−OH + PBr_{3} → 3 RBr + H_{3}PO_{3}

In the Barton–McCombie deoxygenation an alcohol is deoxygenated to an alkane with tributyltin hydride or a trimethylborane-water complex in a radical substitution reaction.

=== Dehydration ===
Meanwhile, the oxygen atom has lone pairs of nonbonded electrons that render it weakly basic in the presence of strong acids such as sulfuric acid. For example, with methanol:

Upon treatment with strong acids, alcohols undergo the E1 elimination reaction to produce alkenes. The reaction, in general, obeys Zaytsev's rule, which states that the most stable (usually the most substituted) alkene is formed. Tertiary alcohols are eliminated easily at just above room temperature, but primary alcohols require a higher temperature.

This is a diagram of acid catalyzed dehydration of ethanol to produce ethylene:

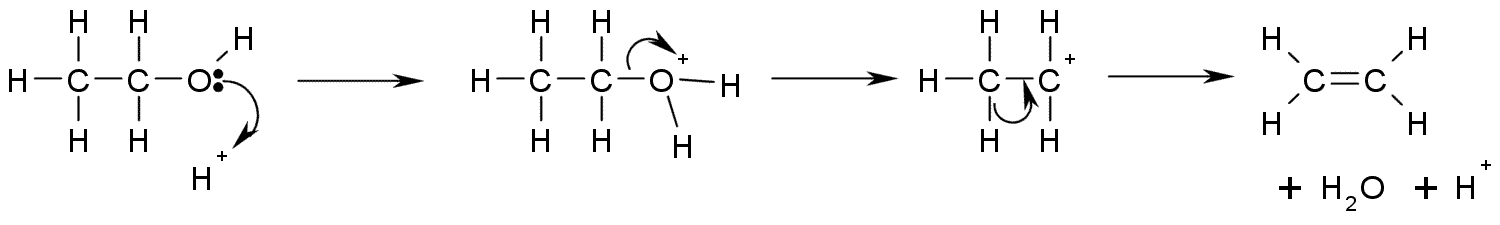

A more controlled elimination reaction requires the formation of the xanthate ester.

=== Protonolysis ===
Tertiary alcohols react with strong acids to generate carbocations. The reaction is related to their dehydration, e.g. isobutylene from tert-butyl alcohol. A special kind of dehydration reaction involves triphenylmethanol and especially its amine-substituted derivatives. When treated with acid, these alcohols lose water to give stable carbocations, which are commercial dyes.

Preparation of crystal violet by protonolysis of the tertiary alcohol.

=== Esterification ===
Alcohol and carboxylic acids react in the so-called Fischer esterification. The reaction usually requires a catalyst, such as concentrated sulfuric acid:

R−OH + R'−CO_{2}H → R'−CO_{2}R + H_{2}O

Other types of ester are prepared in a similar manner−for example, tosyl (tosylate) esters are made by reaction of the alcohol with 4-toluenesulfonyl chloride in pyridine.

=== Oxidation ===
Primary alcohols (R−CH_{2}OH) can be oxidized either to aldehydes (R−CHO) or to carboxylic acids (R−CO_{2}H). The oxidation of secondary alcohols (R^{1}R^{2}CH−OH) normally terminates at the ketone (R^{1}R^{2}C=O) stage. Tertiary alcohols (R^{1}R^{2}R^{3}C−OH) are resistant to oxidation.

The direct oxidation of primary alcohols to carboxylic acids normally proceeds via the corresponding aldehyde, which is transformed via an aldehyde hydrate (R−CH(OH)_{2}) by reaction with water before it can be further oxidized to the carboxylic acid.

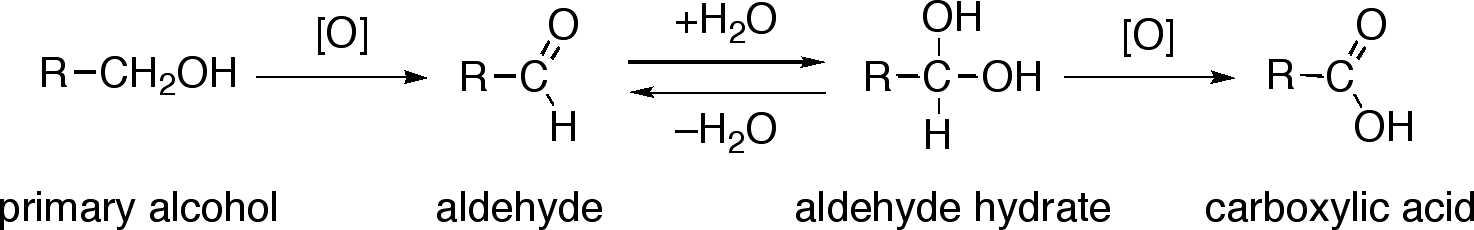
Mechanism of oxidation of primary alcohols to carboxylic acids via aldehydes and aldehyde hydrates

Reagents useful for the transformation of primary alcohols to aldehydes are normally also suitable for the oxidation of secondary alcohols to ketones. These include Collins reagent and Dess–Martin periodinane. The direct oxidation of primary alcohols to carboxylic acids can be carried out using potassium permanganate or the Jones reagent.

== See also ==
- Beer chemistry
- Enol
- Ethanol fuel
- Fatty alcohol
- Index of alcohol-related articles
- List of alcohols
- Lucas test
- Polyol
- Rubbing alcohol
- Sugar alcohol
- Transesterification
- Wine chemistry

== General references ==
- Metcalf AA (1999). The World in So Many Words. Houghton Mifflin. ISBN 0-395-95920-9.
