= 3,3-Dimethyl-1-butanol =

Names
- Preferred IUPAC name 3,3-Dimethylbutan-1-ol
- Other names 3,3-Dimethyl-1-butanol

Identifiers
CAS Number	624-95-3
3D model (JSmol)	Interactive image
ChemSpider	11732
ECHA InfoCard	100.009.884
PubChem CID	12233
UNII	543OYD666T
CompTox Dashboard (EPA)	DTXSID3060796
- InChI: InChI=1S/C6H14O/c1-6(2,3)4-5-7/h7H,4-5H2,1-3H3 Key: DUXCSEISVMREAX-UHFFFAOYSA-N; InChI=1/C6H14O/c1-6(2,3)4-5-7/h7H,4-5H2,1-3H3 Key: DUXCSEISVMREAX-UHFFFAOYAW
- SMILES: CC(C)(C)CCO

Properties
Chemical formula	C_{6}H_{14}O
Molar mass	102.177 g·mol^{−1}
Density	0.844 g/cm^{3} (15 °C)
Melting point	−60 °C (−76 °F; 213 K)
Boiling point	143 °C (289 °F; 416 K)
- Except where otherwise noted, data are given for materials in their standard state (at 25 °C [77 °F], 100 kPa). Infobox references

3,3-Dimethyl-1-butanol (DMB) is a structural analog of choline.

== Effects ==
DMB inhibits microbial trimethylamine (TMA) formation in mice and in human feces, thereby reducing plasma trimethylamine N-oxide (TMAO) levels after choline or carnitine supplementation. It consequently inhibited choline-enhanced endogenous macrophage foam cell formation and atherosclerotic lesion development in mice without alterations in circulating cholesterol levels.

While mice placed on a choline supplemented diet showed an increase in the proportions of the bacterial taxon Clostridiales in the gut, DMB induced a decrease in the proportions of this taxon.

Mice showed no evidence of toxicity to chronic (16-week) DMB exposure.

== Occurrence ==
DMB is found in some balsamic vinegars, red wines, and some cold-pressed extra virgin olive oils and grape seed oils.
