= Acylation =

Chemical reaction which adds an acyl group (R–C=O) to a compound

In chemistry, acylation is a broad class of chemical reactions in which an acyl group (R−C=O) is added to a substrate. The compound providing the acyl group is called the acylating agent. The substrate to be acylated and the product include the following:

- alcohols, esters
- amines, amides
- arenes or alkenes, ketones

A particularly common type of acylation is acetylation, the addition of the acetyl group. Closely related to acylation is formylation, which employ sources of "HCO^{+} in place of "RCO^{+}".

== Examples ==
Because they form a strong electrophile when treated with Lewis acids, acyl halides are commonly used as acylating agents. For example, Friedel–Crafts acylation uses acetyl chloride (CH_{3}COCl) as the agent and aluminum chloride (AlCl_{3}) as a catalyst to add an acetyl group to benzene:

Friedel-Crafts acylation of benzene by ethanoyl chloride

This reaction is an example of electrophilic aromatic substitution.

Acyl halides and acid anhydrides of carboxylic acids are also common acylating agents. In some cases, active esters exhibit comparable reactivity. Amides are hard to activate, but dimethyl sulfate alkylates the amide oxygen to give an active iminium ether cation. All react with amines to form amides and with alcohols to form esters by nucleophilic acyl substitution.

Acylation can be used to prevent rearrangement reactions that would normally occur in alkylation. To do this an acylation reaction is performed, then the carbonyl is removed by Clemmensen reduction or a similar process.

== Acylation in biology ==
Protein acylation is the post-translational modification of proteins via the attachment of functional groups through acyl linkages. Protein acylation has been observed as a mechanism controlling biological signaling. One prominent type is fatty acylation, the addition of fatty acids to particular amino acids (e.g. myristoylation, palmitoylation or palmitoleoylation). Different types of fatty acids engage in global protein acylation. Palmitoleoylation is an acylation type where the monounsaturated fatty acid palmitoleic acid is covalently attached to serine or threonine residues of proteins. Palmitoleoylation appears to play a significant role in the trafficking, targeting, and function of Wnt proteins.

== See also ==
- Acetyl – Chemical group, –C(=O)CH3
- Hydroacylation – Organic reaction
- Ketene – Organic compound of the form >C=C=O
