= Acetyl fluoride =

- Structural formula

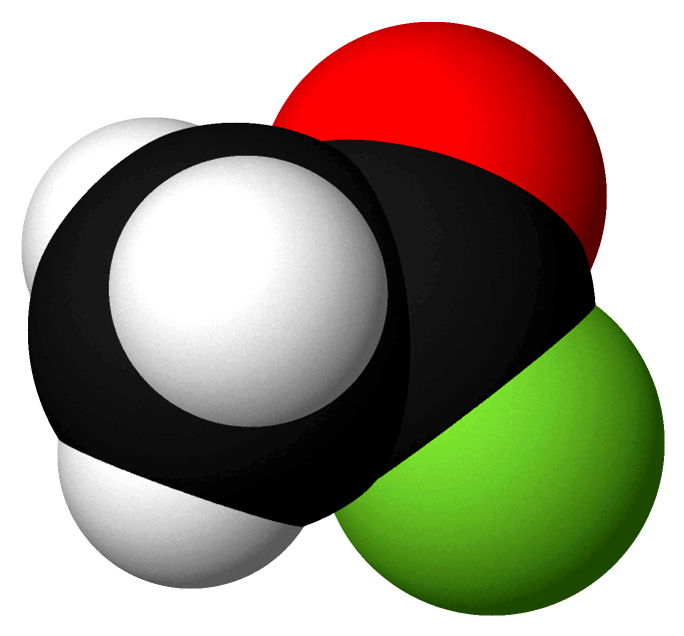
- Space-filling model

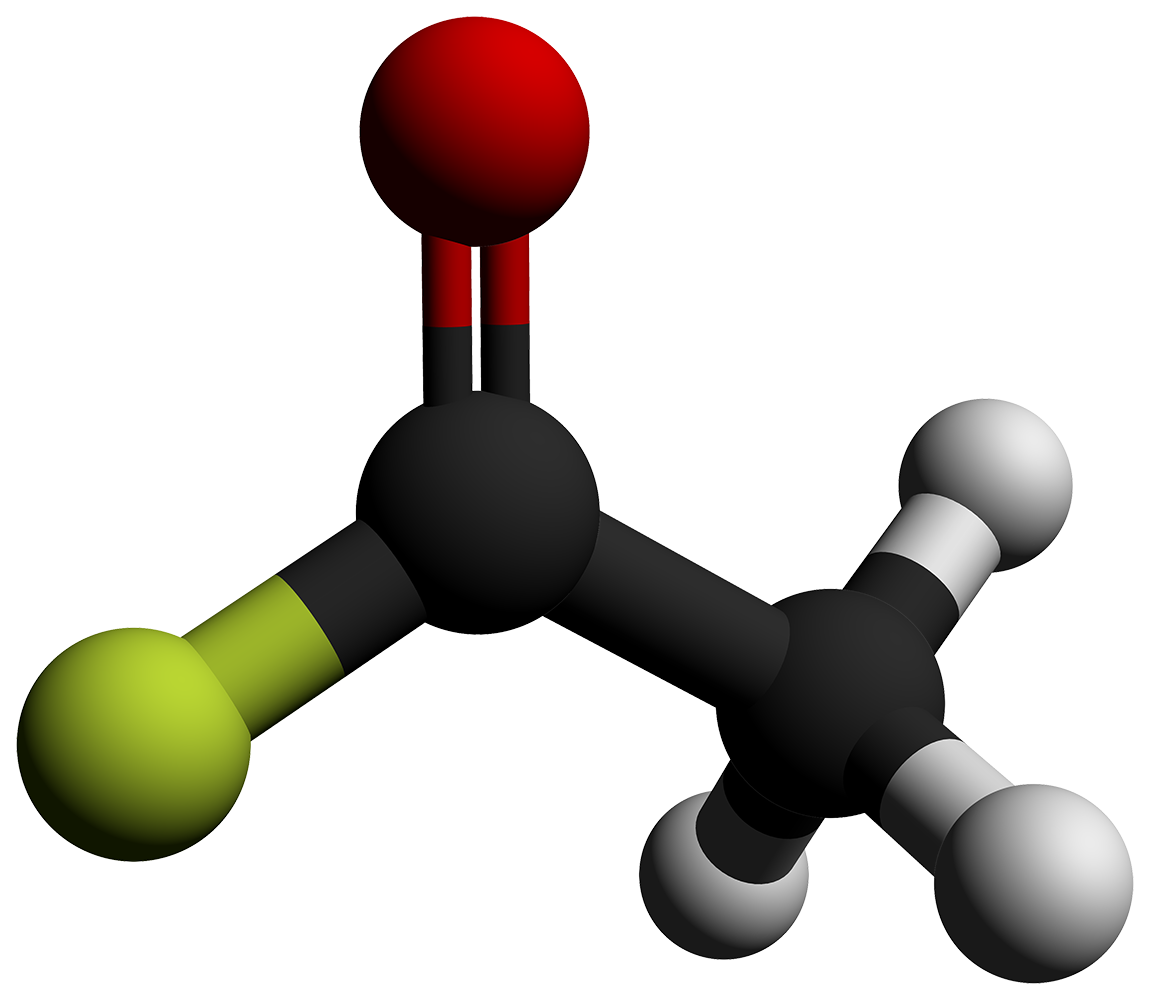
- Ball and stick model

Names
- Preferred IUPAC name Acetyl fluoride
- Systematic IUPAC name Ethanoyl fluoride
- Other names Methylcarbonyl fluoride

Identifiers
CAS Number	557-99-3
3D model (JSmol)	Interactive image
Abbreviations	AcF; FAc
ChEBI	CHEBI:191932
ChemSpider	10731
ECHA InfoCard	100.008.354
PubChem CID	11204
UNII	SFP6JT54SF
CompTox Dashboard (EPA)	DTXSID3060326
- InChI: Key: JUCMRTZQCZRJDC-UHFFFAOYSA-N; InChI=1S/C2H3FO/c1-2(3)4/h1H3
- SMILES: FC(=O)C

Properties
Chemical formula	C_{2}H_{3}FO
Molar mass	62.043 g·mol^{−1}
Appearance	Colorless gas or liquid
Density	1.032 g/cm^{3}
Melting point	−84 °C (−119 °F; 189 K)
Boiling point	21 °C (70 °F; 294 K)

Hazards
- GHS labelling
Pictograms	(GHS05: Corrosive)
Signal word	Danger
Hazard statements	H314
Precautionary statements	P260, P264, P280, P301+P330+P331, P303+P361+P353, P304+P340, P305+P351+P338, P310, P321, P363, P405, P501
- Except where otherwise noted, data are given for materials in their standard state (at 25 °C [77 °F], 100 kPa). Infobox references

Acetyl fluoride is an acyl halide with the chemical formula CH_{3}COF. The formula is commonly abbreviated AcF. This chemical is corrosive. This chemical can be known as Acetyl fluoride, 557-99-3 or Methylcarbonyl fluoride. It carries a oxo group at position 1.

== Synthesis ==
Acetyl fluoride is synthesized using hydrogen fluoride and acetic anhydride. Acetic acid is produced as a byproduct.

HF + (CH_{3}CO)_{2}O → CH_{3}CO_{2}H + CH_{3}COF

== See also ==
- Acetyl chloride
- Acylation
