= Propionic anhydride =

Names
- Preferred IUPAC name Propanoic anhydride
- Other names Propionic anhydride Propanoyl propanoate

Identifiers
CAS Number	123-62-6
3D model (JSmol)	Interactive image
ChEMBL	ChEMBL3186472
ChemSpider	29003
ECHA InfoCard	100.004.218
EC Number	204-638-2
PubChem CID	31263
RTECS number	UF9100000
UNII	E3A2VV18E6
UN number	2496
CompTox Dashboard (EPA)	DTXSID1027007
- InChI: InChI=1S/C6H10O3/c1-3-5(7)9-6(8)4-2/h3-4H2,1-2H3 Key: WYVAMUWZEOHJOQ-UHFFFAOYSA-N; InChI=1/C6H10O3/c1-3-5(7)9-6(8)4-2/h3-4H2,1-2H3 Key: WYVAMUWZEOHJOQ-UHFFFAOYAJ
- SMILES: CCC(=O)OC(=O)CC

Properties
Chemical formula	C_{6}H_{10}O_{3}
Molar mass	130.14 g/mol
Appearance	Clear liquid, with a strong smell similar to vinegar
Density	1.015 g/cm^{3}, liquid
Melting point	−42 °C (−44 °F; 231 K)
Boiling point	167 to 170 °C (333 to 338 °F; 440 to 443 K)
Solubility in water	Reacts to give propanoic acid
Viscosity	1.144 cP at ?°C

Hazards
- Occupational safety and health (OHS/OSH)
Main hazards	flammable
- GHS labelling
Pictograms	(GHS05: Corrosive)
Signal word	Danger
Hazard statements	H314
Precautionary statements	P260, P264, P280, P301+P330+P331, P303+P361+P353, P304+P340, P305+P351+P338, P310, P321, P363, P405, P501
Flash point	63 °C (145 °F; 336 K)
Safety data sheet (SDS)	External MSDS

Related compounds
Related compounds	Acetic anhydride Propanoyl chloride
- Except where otherwise noted, data are given for materials in their standard state (at 25 °C [77 °F], 100 kPa). verify (what is ?) Infobox references

Propionic anhydride is an organic compound with the formula (CH_{3}CH_{2}CO)_{2}O. This simple acid anhydride is a colourless liquid. It is a widely used reagent in organic synthesis as well as for producing specialty derivatives of cellulose.

== Synthesis ==
Industrial route to propionic anhydride involves thermal dehydration of propionic acid, driving off the water by distillation:

2 CH_{3}CH_{2}CO_{2}H → (CH_{3}CH_{2}CO)_{2}O + H_{2}O

Another routes is the Reppe carbonylation of ethylene with propionic acid and nickel carbonyl as the catalyst:

CH_{2}=CH_{2} + CH_{3}CH_{2}CO_{2}H + CO → (CH_{3}CH_{2}CO)_{2}O

Propionic anhydride has also been prepared by dehydration of propionic acid using ketene:

2 CH_{3}CH_{2}CO_{2}H + CH_{2}=C=O → (CH_{3}CH_{2}CO)_{2}O + CH_{3}CO_{2}H

== Safety ==
Propanoic anhydride is strong smelling and corrosive, and will cause burns on contact with skin. Vapour can burn eyes and lungs.

== Legal Status ==
Due to its potential use as a precursor in the synthesis of fentanyl and fentanyl analogs, propanoic anhydride is regulated by the United States Drug Enforcement Administration as a List I chemical under the Controlled Substances Act.
