= Acetyl iodide =

Skeletal formula of acetyl iodide
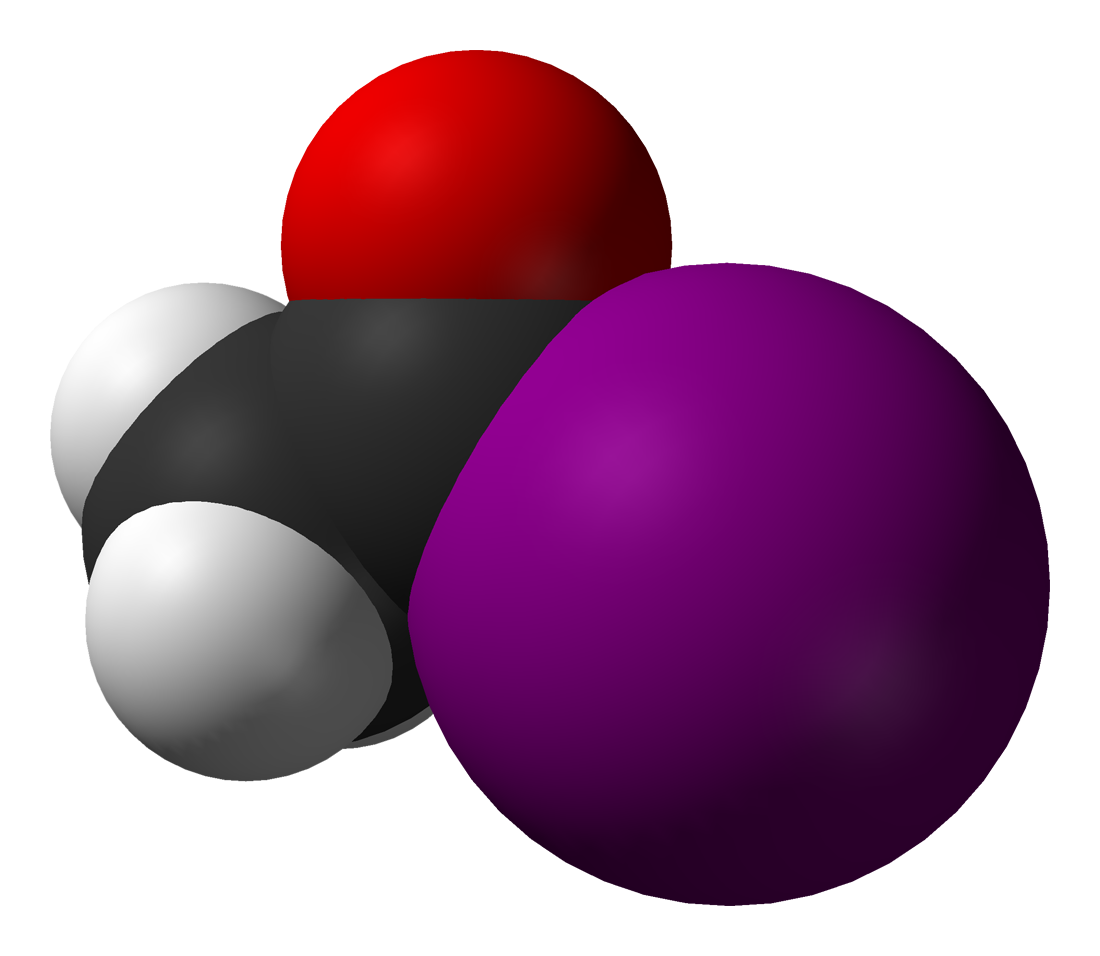
Spacefill model of acetyl iodide

Names
- Preferred IUPAC name Acetyl iodide
- Systematic IUPAC name Ethanoyl iodide

Identifiers
CAS Number	507-02-8
3D model (JSmol)	Interactive image
ChemSpider	10051
ECHA InfoCard	100.007.330
EC Number	208-062-2
PubChem CID	10483
UNII	JAL3KV9I1O
UN number	1898
CompTox Dashboard (EPA)	DTXSID0060141
- InChI: InChI=1S/C2H3IO/c1-2(3)4/h1H3 Key: LEKJTGQWLAUGQA-UHFFFAOYSA-N; InChI=1/C2H3IO/c1-2(3)4/h1H3 Key: LEKJTGQWLAUGQA-UHFFFAOYAR
- SMILES: CC(I)=O

Properties
Chemical formula	C_{2}H_{3}IO
Molar mass	169.949 g·mol^{−1}
Boiling point	108 °C; 226 °F; 381 K
Solubility in water	Decomposes

Thermochemistry
Std enthalpy of formation (Δ_{f}H^{⦵}_{298})	−163.18 – −161.42 kJ mol^{−1}

Related compounds
Related acyl halides	Acetyl chloride
Related compounds	Acetic acid Acetic anhydride
- Except where otherwise noted, data are given for materials in their standard state (at 25 °C [77 °F], 100 kPa). verify (what is ?) Infobox references

Acetyl iodide is an organoiodine compound with the formula CH_{3}COI. It is a colourless liquid. It is formally derived from acetic acid. Although far rarer in the laboratory than the related acetyl bromide and acetyl chloride, acetyl iodide is produced, transiently at least, on a far larger scale than any other acid halide. Specifically, it is generated by the carbonylation of methyl iodide in the Cativa and Monsanto processes, which are the main industrial processes that generate acetic acid. It is also an intermediate in the production of acetic anhydride from methyl acetate.

Upon treatment with carboxylic acids, acetyl iodide does not exhibit reactions typical of acyl halides, such as acetyl chloride. Instead, acetyl iodide undergoes iodide/hydroxide exchange with most carboxylic acids:

CH_{3}COI + RCO_{2}H → CH_{3}CO_{2}H + RCOI
