= C2H3FO =

The molecular formula C_{2}H_{3}FO (molar mass: 62.04 g/mol, exact mass: 62.0179 u) may refer to:

- Acetyl fluoride
- Fluoroacetaldehyde
