= Acetyl chloride =

Organic compound (CH3COCl)

Skeletal formula of acetyl chloride
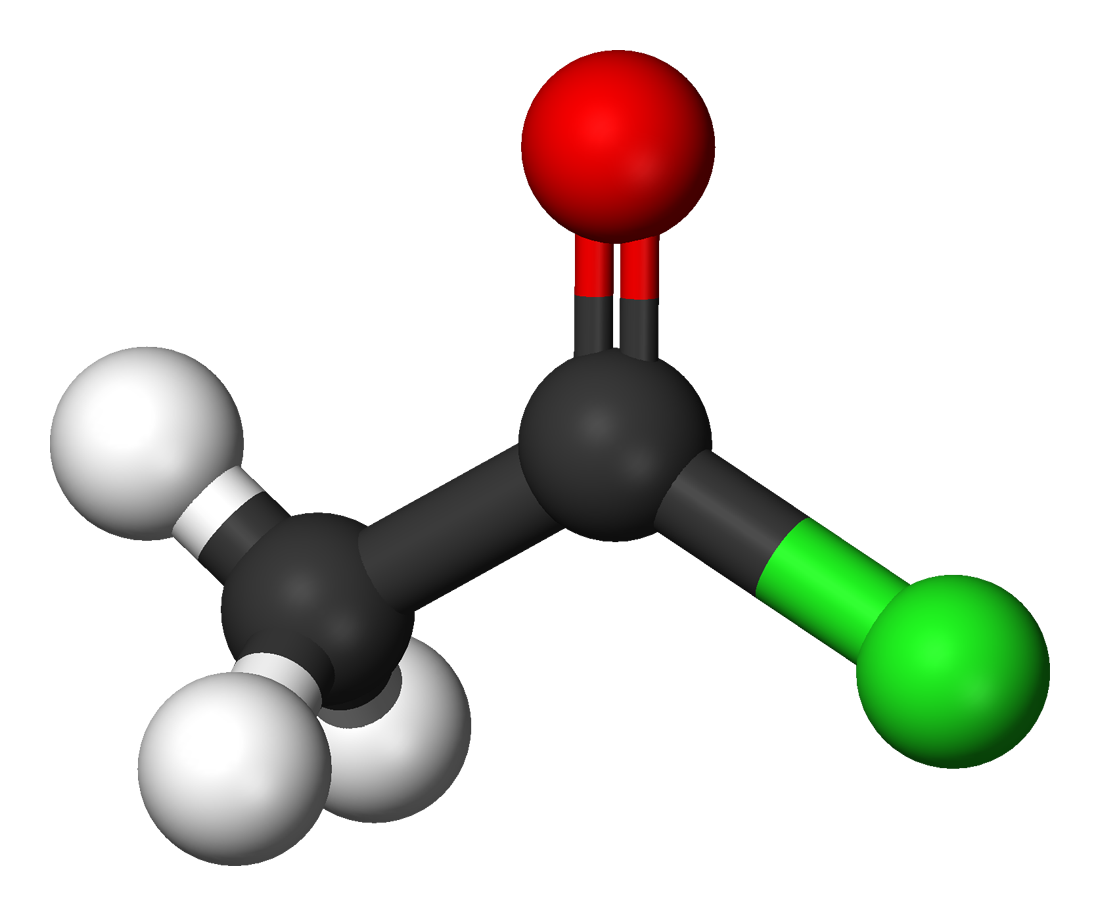
Ball-and-stick model of acetyl chloride
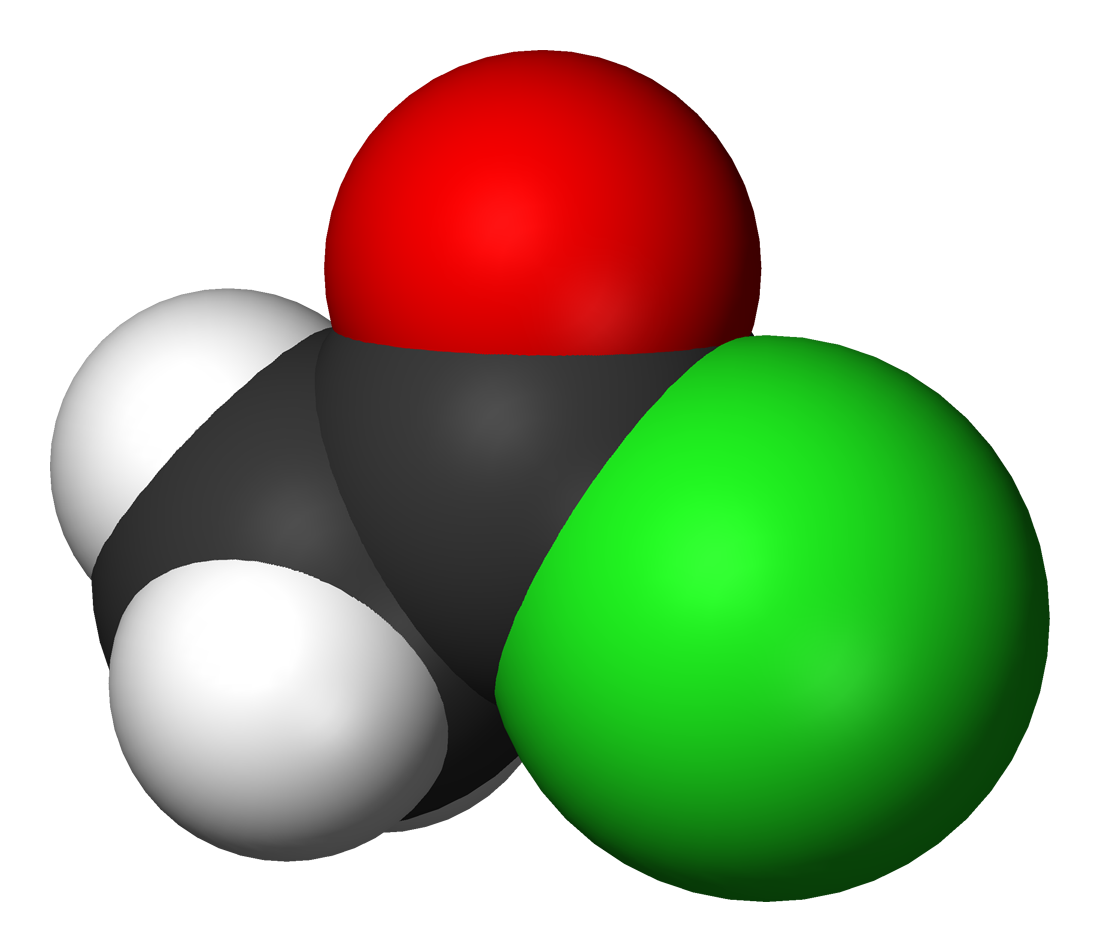
- Space-filling model of acetyl chloride

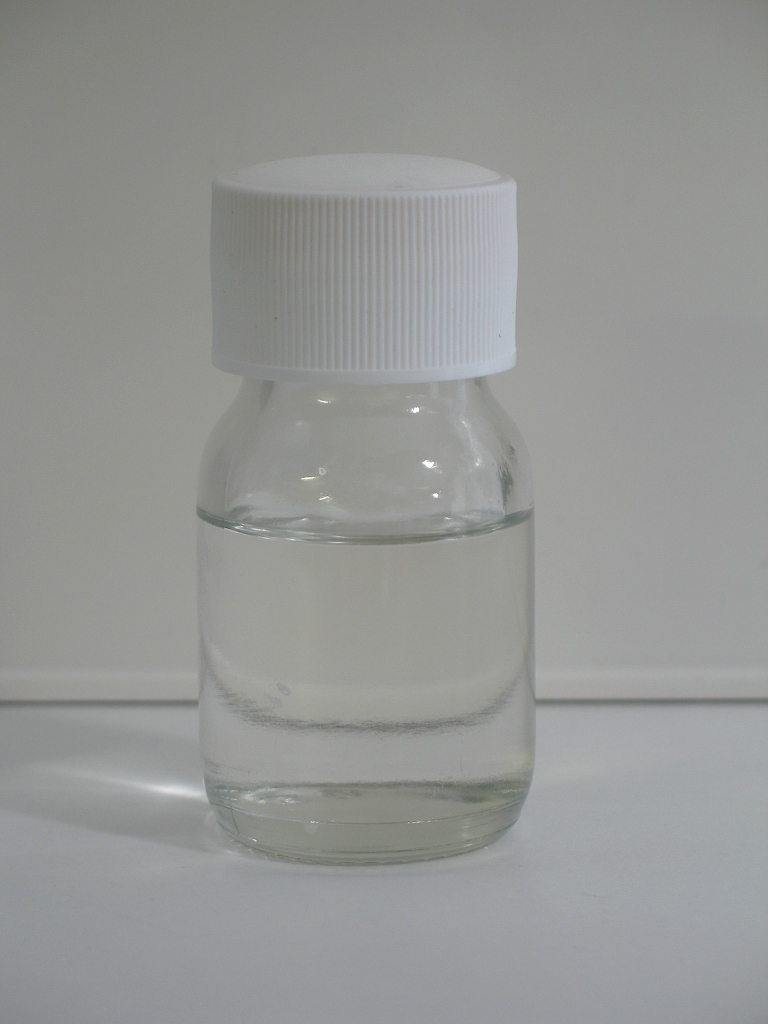

Names
- Preferred IUPAC name Acetyl chloride
- Systematic IUPAC name Ethanoyl chloride
- Other names Acyl chloride

Identifiers
CAS Number	75-36-5
3D model (JSmol)	Interactive image
Abbreviations	AcCl
Beilstein Reference	605303
ChEBI	CHEBI:37580
ChemSpider	6127
DrugBank	DB14623
ECHA InfoCard	100.000.787
EC Number	200-865-6
Gmelin Reference	1611
PubChem CID	6367
RTECS number	AO6390000
UNII	QD15RNO45K
UN number	1717
CompTox Dashboard (EPA)	DTXSID2023852
- InChI: InChI=1S/C2H3ClO/c1-2(3)4/h1H3 Key: WETWJCDKMRHUPV-UHFFFAOYSA-N; InChI=1/C2H3ClO/c1-2(3)4/h1H3 Key: WETWJCDKMRHUPV-UHFFFAOYAQ
- SMILES: ClC(=O)C

Properties
Chemical formula	C_{2}H_{3}ClO
Molar mass	78.50 g·mol^{−1}
Appearance	Colorless liquid
Density	1.104 g/ml, liquid
Melting point	−112 °C (−170 °F; 161 K)
Boiling point	52 °C (126 °F; 325 K)
Solubility in water	Reacts with water
Magnetic susceptibility (χ)	−38.9·10^{−6} cm^{3}/mol

Structure
Dipole moment	2.45 D

Hazards
- GHS labelling
Pictograms	(GHS02: Flammable) (GHS05: Corrosive) (GHS07: Exclamation mark)
Signal word	Danger
Hazard statements	H225, H302, H314, H335, H412
Precautionary statements	P210, P233, P240, P241, P242, P243, P260, P264, P270, P271, P273, P280, P301+P312, P301+P330+P331, P303+P361+P353, P304+P340, P305+P351+P338, P310, P312, P321, P330, P363, P370+P378, P403+P233, P403+P235, P405, P501
NFPA 704 (fire diamond)	3 3 2 W
Flash point	4 °C (39 °F; 277 K)
Autoignition temperature	390 °C (734 °F; 663 K)
Explosive limits	7.3–19%

Related compounds
Related acyl chlorides	Propionyl chloride Butyryl chloride
Related compounds	Acetic acid Acetic anhydride Acetyl bromide
- Except where otherwise noted, data are given for materials in their standard state (at 25 °C [77 °F], 100 kPa). verify (what is ?) Infobox references

Acetyl chloride (CH_{3}COCl) is an acyl chloride derived from acetic acid (CH_{3}COOH). It belongs to the class of organic compounds called acid halides. It is a colorless, corrosive, volatile liquid. Its formula is commonly abbreviated to AcCl.

== Synthesis ==
On an industrial scale, the reaction of acetic anhydride with hydrogen chloride produces a mixture of acetyl chloride and acetic acid:

(CH_{3}CO)_{2}O + HCl → CH_{3}COCl + CH_{3}CO_{2}H

=== Laboratory routes ===
Acetyl chloride was first prepared in 1852 by French chemist Charles Gerhardt by treating potassium acetate with phosphoryl chloride.

Acetyl chloride is produced in the laboratory by the reaction of acetic acid with chlorodehydrating agents such as phosphorus trichloride (PCl_{3}), phosphorus pentachloride (PCl_{5}), sulfuryl chloride (SO_{2}Cl_{2}), phosgene, or thionyl chloride (SOCl_{2}). However, these methods usually give acetyl chloride contaminated by phosphorus or sulfur impurities, which may interfere with the organic reactions.

=== Other methods ===
When heated, a mixture of dichloroacetyl chloride and acetic acid gives acetyl chloride. It can also be synthesized from the catalytic carbonylation of methyl chloride.

== Occurrence ==
Acetyl chloride is not expected to exist in nature, because contact with water would hydrolyze it into acetic acid and hydrogen chloride. In fact, if handled in open air it releases white "smoke" resulting from hydrolysis due to the moisture in the air. The smoke is actually small droplets of hydrochloric acid and acetic acid formed by hydrolysis.

== Uses ==
Acetyl chloride is used for acetylation reactions, i.e., the introduction of an acetyl group. Acetyl is an acyl group having the formula −C(=O)−CH_{3}. For further information on the types of chemical reactions compounds such as acetyl chloride can undergo, see acyl halide. Two major classes of acetylations include esterification and the Friedel-Crafts reaction.

=== Acetic acid esters and amide ===
Acetyl chloride is a reagent for the preparation of esters and amides of acetic acid, used in the derivatization of alcohols and amines. One class of acetylation reactions are esterification, for example the reaction with ethanol to produce ethyl acetate and hydrogen chloride:

CH_{3}COCl + HO−CH_{2}−CH_{3} → CH_{3}−COO−CH_{2}−CH_{3} + HCl

Frequently such acylations are carried out in the presence of a base such as pyridine, triethylamine, or DMAP, which act as catalysts to help promote the reaction and as bases neutralize the resulting HCl. Such reactions will often proceed via ketene.

=== Friedel-Crafts acetylations ===
A second major class of acetylation reactions are the Friedel-Crafts reactions.

== See also ==
- Acetic acid
- Acetyl bromide
- Acetyl fluoride
- Acetyl iodide
