= Cativa process =

Method for the manufacture of acetic acid

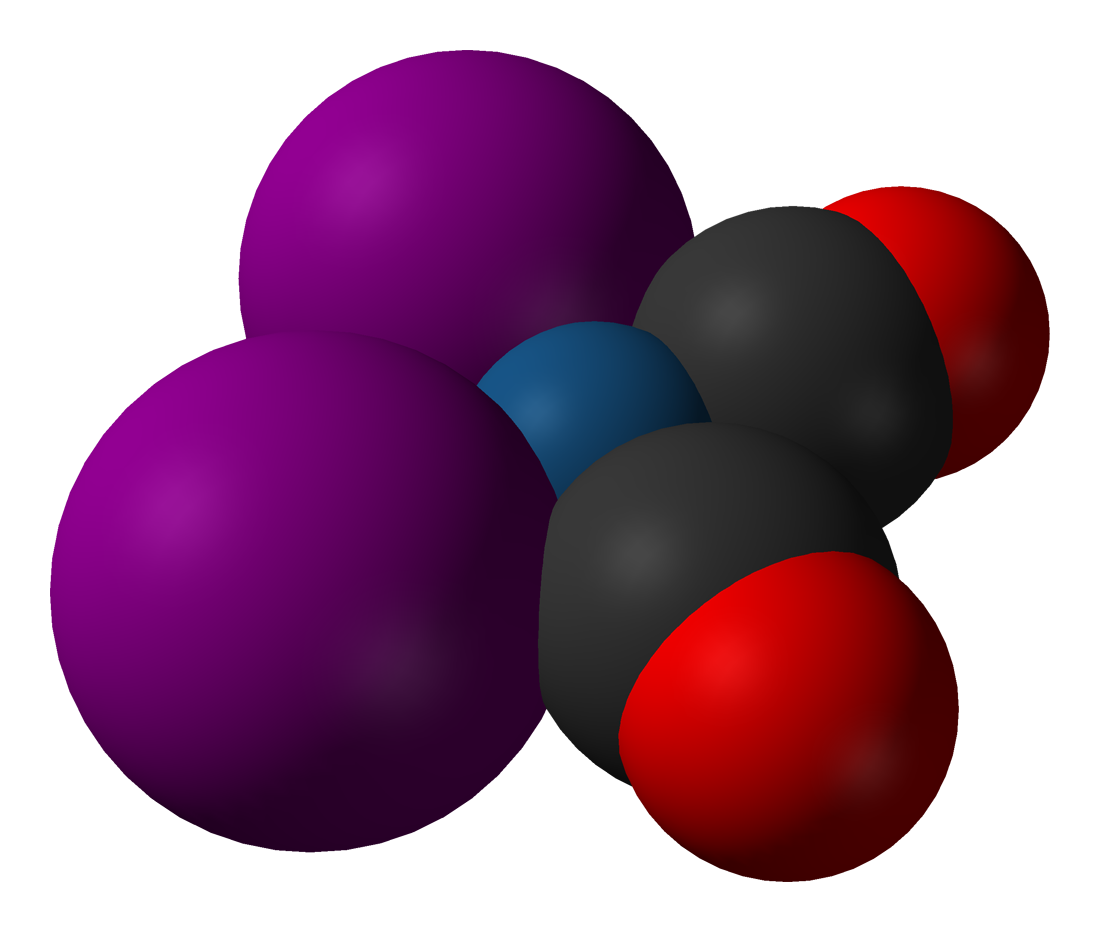
Space-filling model of the [Ir(CO)_{2}I_{2}]^{−} catalyst used in the Cativa process

The Cativa process is a method for the production of acetic acid by the carbonylation of methanol. The technology, which is similar to the Monsanto process, was developed by BP Chemicals and is under license by BP Plc. The process is based on an iridium-containing catalyst, such as the anionic complex diiododicarbonyliridate(i) [Ir(CO)_{2}I_{2}]^{−} (1).

The Cativa and Monsanto processes are sufficiently similar that they can use the same chemical plant. Initial studies by Monsanto had shown iridium to be less active than rhodium for the carbonylation of methanol. Subsequent research, however, showed that the iridium catalyst could be promoted by ruthenium, and this combination leads to a catalyst that is superior to the rhodium-based systems. The switch from rhodium to iridium also allows the use of less water in the reaction mixture. This change reduces the number of drying columns necessary, decreases formation of by-products, such as propionic acid, and suppresses the water gas shift reaction.

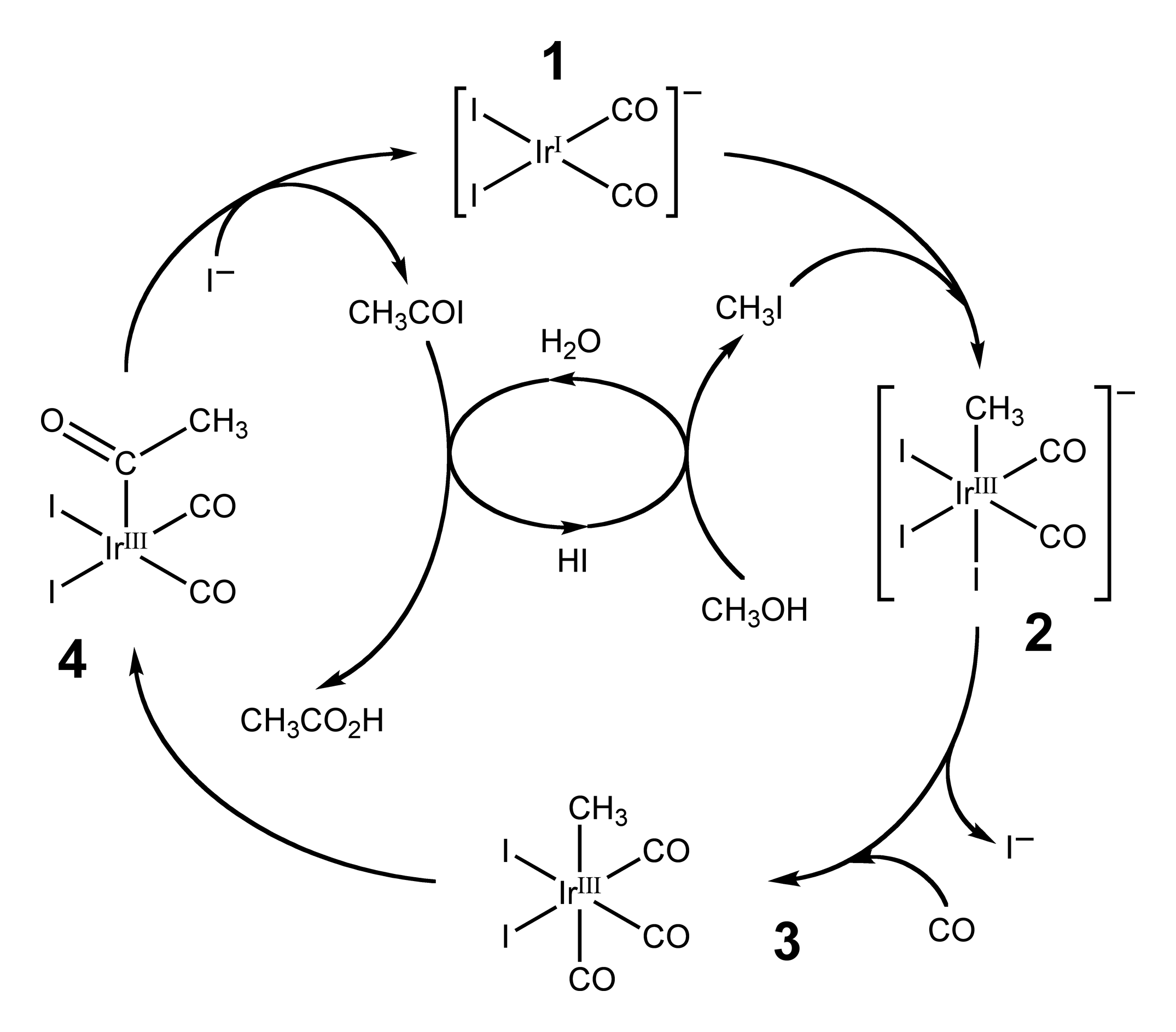
The catalytic cycle of the Cativa process

The catalytic cycle for the Cativa process, shown above, begins with the reaction of methyl iodide with the square planar active catalyst species (1) to form the octahedral iridium(III) species (2), the fac-isomer of [Ir(CO)_{2}(CH_{3})I_{3}]^{−}. This oxidative addition reaction involves the formal insertion of the iridium(I) centre into the carbon-iodine bond of methyl iodide. After ligand exchange (iodide for carbon monoxide), the migratory insertion of carbon monoxide into the iridium-carbon bond, step (3) to (4), results in the formation of a square pyramidal species with a bound acetyl ligand. The active catalyst species (1) is regenerated by the reductive elimination of acetyl iodide from (4), a de-insertion reaction. The acetyl iodide is hydrolysed to produce the acetic acid product, in the process generating hydroiodic acid which is in turn used to convert the starting material (methanol) to the methyl iodide used in the first step.
