= Monsanto process =

Method for the manufacture of acetic acid

The Monsanto process is an industrial method for the manufacture of acetic acid by catalytic carbonylation of methanol. The Monsanto process has largely been supplanted by the Cativa process, a similar iridium-based process developed by BP Chemicals Ltd, which is more economical and environmentally friendly.

This process operates at a pressure of 30–60 atm and a temperature of 150–200 °C and gives a selectivity greater than 99%. It was developed in 1960 by the German chemical company BASF and improved by the Monsanto Company in 1966, which introduced a new catalyst system.

== Catalytic cycle ==
The catalytic cycle of the Monsanto process

The catalytically active species is the anion cis-[Rh(CO)_{2}I_{2}]^{−} (top of scheme). The first organometallic step is the oxidative addition of methyl iodide to cis-[Rh(CO)_{2}I_{2}]^{−} to form the hexacoordinate species [(CH_{3})Rh(CO)_{2}I_{3}]^{−}. This anion rapidly transforms, via the migration of a methyl group to an adjacent carbonyl ligand, affording the pentacoordinate acetyl complex [(CH_{3}CO)Rh(CO)I_{3}]^{−}. This five-coordinate complex then reacts with carbon monoxide to form the six-coordinate dicarbonyl complex, which undergoes reductive elimination to release acetyl iodide (CH_{3}C(O)I). The catalytic cycle involves two non-organometallic steps: conversion of methanol to methyl iodide and the hydrolysis of the acetyl iodide to acetic acid and hydrogen iodide.

The reaction has been shown to be first-order with respect to methyl iodide and [Rh(CO)_{2}I_{2}]^{−}. Hence the oxidative addition of methyl iodide is proposed as the rate-determining step.

== Tennessee Eastman acetic anhydride process ==
Acetic anhydride is produced by carbonylation of methyl acetate in a process that is similar to the Monsanto acetic acid synthesis. Methyl acetate is used in place of methanol as a source of methyl iodide.

CH_{3}CO_{2}CH_{3} + CO → (CH_{3}CO)_{2}O

In this process lithium iodide converts methyl acetate to lithium acetate and methyl iodide, which in turn affords, through carbonylation, acetyl iodide. Acetyl iodide reacts with acetate salts or acetic acid to give the anhydride. Rhodium iodides and lithium salts are employed as catalysts. Because acetic anhydride hydrolyzes, the conversion is conducted under anhydrous conditions in contrast to the Monsanto acetic acid synthesis.
