= Acetic anhydride =

Organic compound with formula (CH3CO)2O

- Acetic anhydride

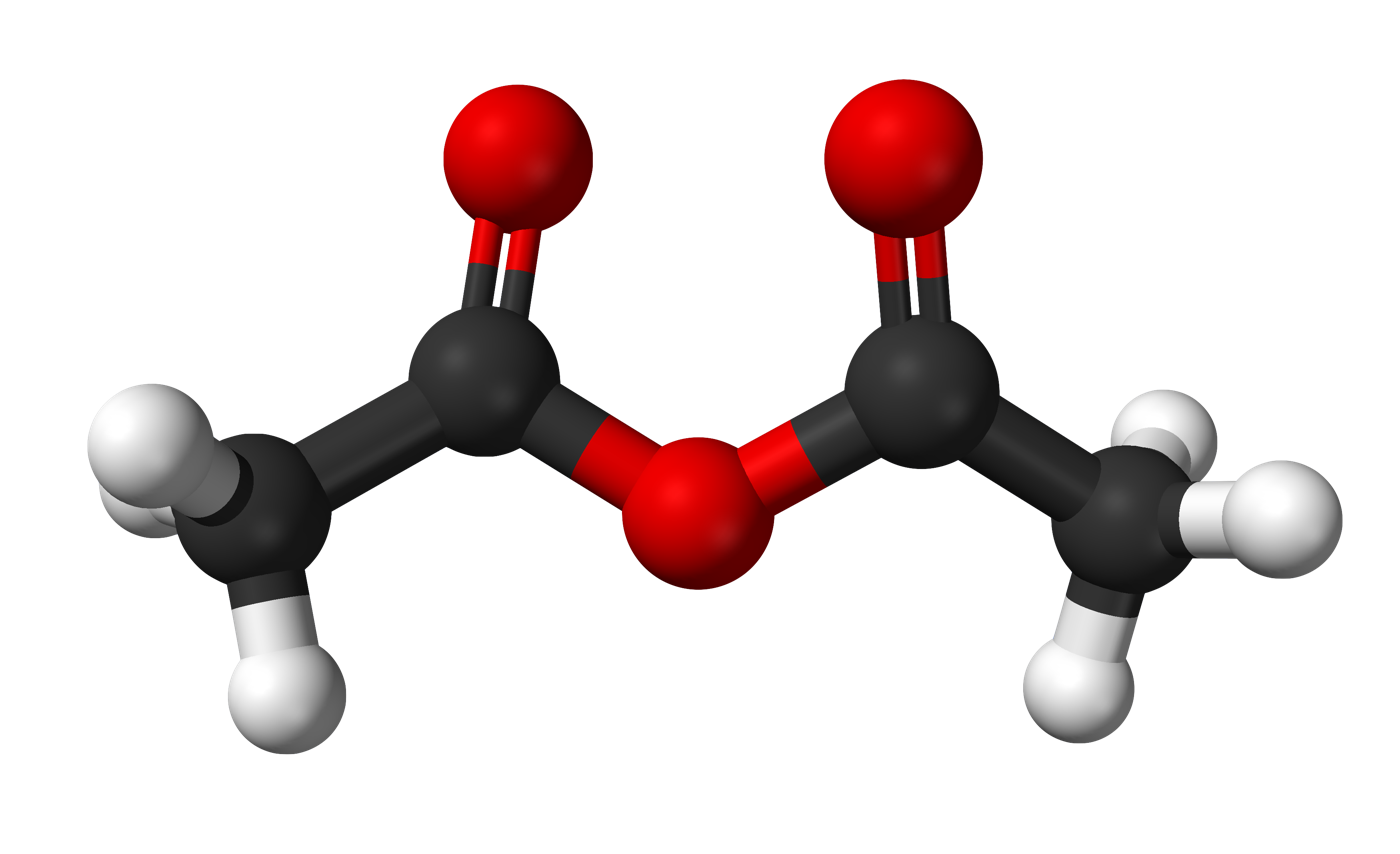
- Acetic anhydride

Names
- Preferred IUPAC name Acetic anhydride
- Systematic IUPAC name Ethanoic anhydride
- Other names Ethanoyl ethanoate Acetic acid anhydride Acetyl acetate Acetyl oxide Acetic oxide

Identifiers
| CAS Number | 108-24-7 |
| 3D model (JSmol) | Interactive image; Interactive image |
| Abbreviations | Ac_{2}O |
| ChEBI | CHEBI:36610 |
| ChEMBL | ChEMBL1305819 |
| ChemSpider | 7630 |
| ECHA InfoCard | 100.003.241 |
| EC Number | 203-564-8 |
| PubChem CID | 7918 |
| RTECS number | AK1925000 |
| UNII | 2E48G1QI9Q |
| UN number | 1715 |
| CompTox Dashboard (EPA) | DTXSID0024395 |
- InChI: InChI=1S/C4H6O3/c1-3(5)7-4(2)6/h1-2H3 Key: WFDIJRYMOXRFFG-UHFFFAOYSA-N; InChI=1/C4H6O3/c1-3(5)7-4(2)6/h1-2H3 Key: WFDIJRYMOXRFFG-UHFFFAOYAH
- SMILES: O=C(OC(=O)C)C; CC(=O)OC(=O)C

Properties
| Chemical formula | C_{4}H_{6}O_{3} |
| Molar mass | 102.089 g·mol^{−1} |
| Appearance | colorless liquid |
| Density | 1.082 g cm^{−3}, liquid |
| Melting point | −73.1 °C (−99.6 °F; 200.1 K) |
| Boiling point | 139.8 °C (283.6 °F; 412.9 K) |
| Solubility in water | 2.6 g/100 mL, reacts (see text) |
| Vapor pressure | 4 mmHg (20 °C) |
| Magnetic susceptibility (χ) | −52.8·10^{−6} cm^{3}/mol |
| Refractive index (n_{D}) | 1.3901 |

Thermochemistry
| Std enthalpy of formation (Δ_{f}H^{⦵}_{298}) | −624.4 kJ/mol |

Pharmacology
| Legal status | AU: S6 (Poison); CA: Schedule VI |

Hazards
- GHS labelling
| Pictograms | (GHS02: Flammable) (GHS05: Corrosive) (GHS06: Toxic) |
| Signal word | Danger |
| Hazard statements | H226, H302, H314, H332 |
| Precautionary statements | P210, P233, P240, P241, P242, P243, P260, P264, P270, P271, P280, P301+P312, P301+P330+P331, P303+P361+P353, P304+P312, P304+P340, P305+P351+P338, P310, P312, P321, P330, P363, P370+P378, P403+P235, P405, P501 |
| NFPA 704 (fire diamond) | 3 2 1 W |
| Flash point | 49 °C (120 °F; 322 K) |
| Autoignition temperature | 316 °C (601 °F; 589 K) |
| Explosive limits | 2.7–10.3% |
- Lethal dose or concentration (LD, LC)
| LC_{50} (median concentration) | 1000 ppm (rat, 4 h) |
- NIOSH (US health exposure limits)
| PEL (Permissible) | TWA 5 ppm (20 mg/m^{3}) |
| REL (Recommended) | C 5 ppm (20 mg/m^{3}) |
| IDLH (Immediate danger) | 200 ppm |
| Safety data sheet (SDS) | ICSC 0209 |

Related compounds
| Related acid anhydrides | Propionic anhydride |
| Related compounds | Acetic acid Acetyl chloride |
- Except where otherwise noted, data are given for materials in their standard state (at 25 °C [77 °F], 100 kPa). verify (what is ?) Infobox references

Acetic anhydride, or ethanoic anhydride, is the chemical compound with the formula (CH_{3}CO)_{2}O. Commonly abbreviated Ac_{2}O, it is one the simplest anhydrides of a carboxylic acid and is widely used in the production of cellulose acetate and heroin, as well as a reagent in organic synthesis. It is a colorless liquid that smells strongly of acetic acid, which is formed by its reaction with moisture in the air.

== Structure and properties ==
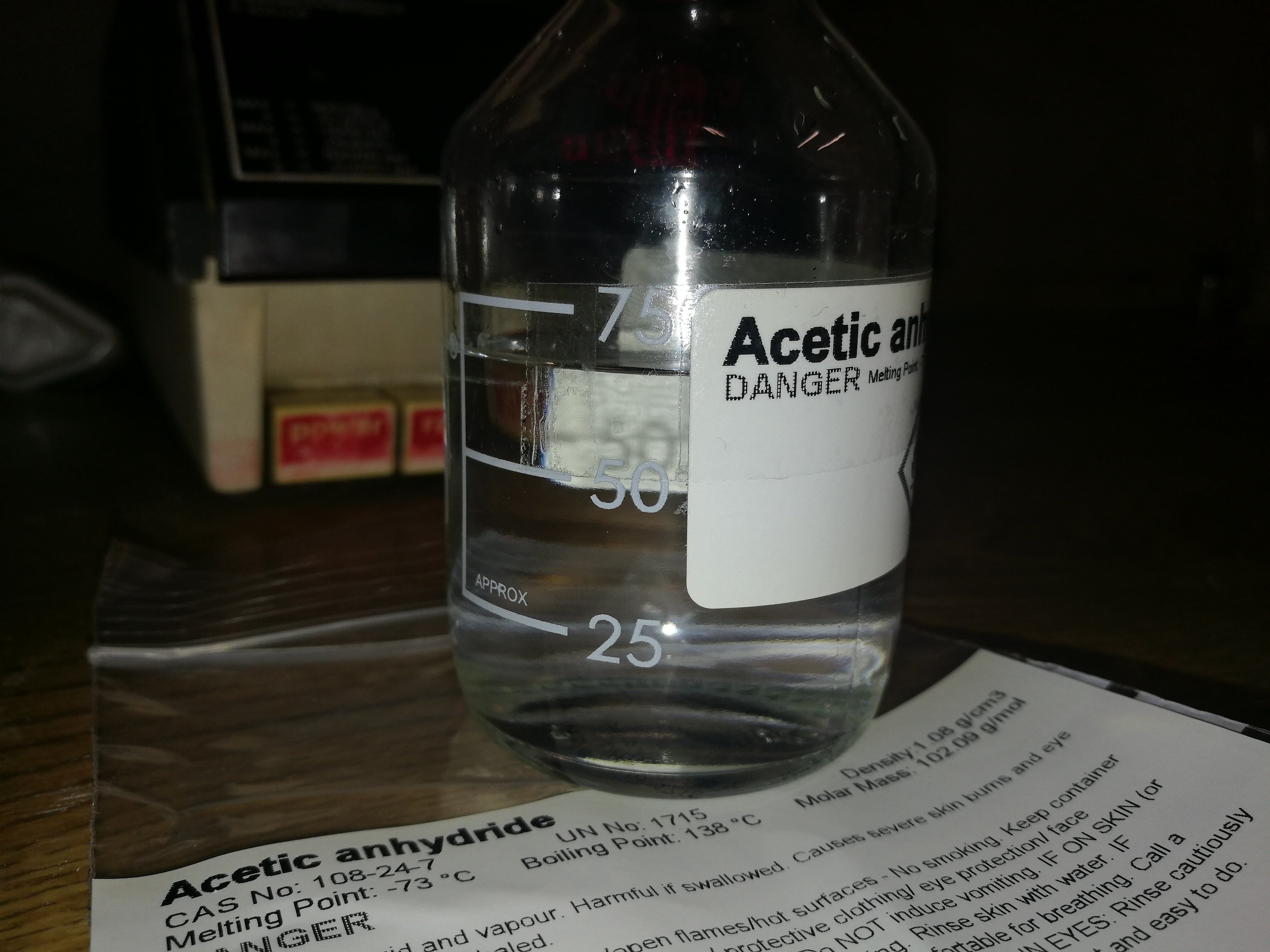
Acetic anhydride in a glass bottle

Acetic anhydride, like most organic acid anhydrides, is a flexible molecule with a non-planar structure. The C=O and C-O distances are 1.19 and 1.39 Å. The pi system linkage through the central oxygen offers very weak resonance stabilization compared to the dipole-dipole repulsion between the two carbonyl oxygens. The energy barriers to bond rotation between each of the optimal aplanar conformations are quite low.

== Production ==
Acetic anhydride was first synthesized in 1852 by the French chemist Charles Frédéric Gerhardt (1816-1856) by heating potassium acetate with benzoyl chloride.

Acetic anhydride is produced by carbonylation of methyl acetate:

CH_{3}CO_{2}CH_{3} + CO → (CH_{3}CO)_{2}O

The Tennessee Eastman acetic anhydride process involves the conversion of methyl acetate to methyl iodide. Carbonylation of the methyl iodide produces acetyl iodide, which reacts with acetate source to give the desired anhydride. Rhodium chloride in the presence of lithium iodide is employed as the catalyst. Because acetic anhydride is not stable in water, the conversion is conducted under anhydrous conditions.

To a decreasing extent, acetic anhydride is also prepared by the reaction of ketene (ethenone) with acetic acid at 45–55 °C and low pressure (0.05–0.2 bar).

H_{2}C=C=O + CH_{3}COOH → (CH_{3}CO)_{2}O
(ΔH = −63 kJ/mol)

The route from acetic acid to acetic anhydride via ketene was developed by Wacker Chemie in 1922, when the demand for acetic anhydride increased due to the production of cellulose acetate.

=== Laboratory methods ===
Due to its low cost, acetic anhydride is usually purchased, not prepared, for use in research laboratories. Acetic anhydride can be prepared in the laboratory by treating acetic acid with p-toluenesulfonyl chloride.

== Reactions ==
Acetic anhydride is a versatile reagent for acetylations, the introduction of acetyl groups to organic substrates. In these conversions, acetic anhydride is viewed as a source of CH_{3}CO^{+}.

=== Acetylation of alcohols, amines, aromatics ===
Alcohols and amines are readily acetylated. For example, the reaction of acetic anhydride with ethanol yields ethyl acetate:

(CH_{3}CO)_{2}O + CH_{3}CH_{2}OH → CH_{3}CO_{2}CH_{2}CH_{3} + CH_{3}COOH

Often a base such as pyridine is added to function as catalyst. In specialized applications, Lewis acidic scandium salts have also proven effective catalysts.

Aromatic rings are acetylated by acetic anhydride. Usually acid catalysts are used to accelerate the reaction. Illustrative are the conversions of benzene to acetophenone and ferrocene to acetylferrocene:

(C_{5}H_{5})_{2}Fe + (CH_{3}CO)_{2}O → (C_{5}H_{5})Fe(C_{5}H_{4}COCH_{3}) + CH_{3}CO_{2}H

=== Preparation of other acid anhydrides ===
Dicarboxylic acids are converted to the anhydrides upon treatment with acetic anhydride. It is also used for the preparation of mixed anhydrides such as that with nitric acid, acetyl nitrate.

=== Precursor to geminal diacetates ===
Aldehydes react with acetic anhydride in the presence of an acidic catalyst to give geminal diacetates. A former industrial route to vinyl acetate involved the intermediate ethylidene diacetate, the geminal diacetate obtained from acetaldehyde and acetic anhydride:

CH_{3}CHO + (CH_{3}CO)_{2}O → (CH_{3}CO_{2})_{2}CHCH_{3}

=== Hydrolysis ===
Acetic anhydride dissolves in water to approximately 2.6% by weight. Aqueous solutions have limited stability because, like most acid anhydrides, acetic anhydride hydrolyses to give carboxylic acids. In this case, acetic acid is formed, this reaction product being fully water miscible:

(CH_{3}CO)_{2}O + H_{2}O → 2 CH_{3}COOH

=== Enolate formation ===
Acetic anhydride forms the enolate in the presence of acetate as base. The enolate can be trapped by condensation with benzaldehyde. In the 19th century, this chemistry, the Perkin reaction, was used for the production of cinnamic acid:

(CH_{3}CO)_{2}O + C_{6}H_{5}CHO → C_{6}H_{5}CH=CHCO_{2}H + CH_{3}CO_{2}H

=== Lewis base properties ===
The carbonyl groups in acetic anhydride are weakly basic. A number of adducts are known, such as the derivative of titanium tetrachloride, TiCl_{4}((CH_{3}CO)_{2}O).

== Applications ==
As indicated by its organic chemistry, acetic anhydride is mainly used for acetylations leading to commercially significant materials. Its largest application is for the conversion of cellulose to cellulose acetate, which is a component of photographic film and other coated materials, and is used in the manufacture of cigarette filters. Similarly it is used in the production of aspirin (acetylsalicylic acid), which is prepared by the acetylation of salicylic acid. It is also used as an active modification agent via autoclave impregnation and subsequent acetylation to make a durable and long-lasting timber.

Acetic anhydride is commonly used for the production of modified starches (E1414, E1420, E1422).

== Legal status ==
Because of its use for the synthesis of heroin by the diacetylation of morphine, acetic anhydride is listed as a U.S. DEA List II precursor and is restricted in many other countries.

== Safety ==
Acetic anhydride is an irritant and combustible liquid; it is highly corrosive to skin and any direct contact will result in burns. Because of its reactivity toward water and alcohol, foam or carbon dioxide are preferred for fire suppression.
