= Amide (functional group) =

Structures of three kinds of amides: an organic amide (carboxamide), a sulfonamide, and a phosphoramide.

In chemistry, the term amide (/ˈæmaɪd/ or /ˈæmɪd/ or /ˈeɪmaɪd/) is a compound with the functional group R_{n}E(=O)_{x}NR_{2}, where x is not zero, E is some element, and each R represents an organic group or hydrogen. It is a derivative of an oxoacid R_{n}E(=O)_{x}OH with an hydroxy group –OH replaced by an amine group –NR_{2}.

Some important subclasses are

- carboxamides, or organic amides, where E = carbon, with the general formula RC(=O)NR_{2}.
- phosphoramides, where E = phosphorus, such as R_{2}P(=O)NR_{2}
- sulfonamides, where E = sulfur, namely RS(=O)_{2}NR_{2}

The term amide may also refer to

- amide group, a functional group –C(=O)N= consisting of a carbonyl adjacent to a nitrogen atom.
- cyclic amide or lactam, a cyclic compound with the amide group –C(=O)N– in the ring.
- metal amide, an ionic compound ("salt") with the azanide anion H_{2}N^{−} (the conjugate base of ammonia) or to a derivative thereof R_{2}N^{−}.

There is also a neutral amino radical (•NH_{2}) and a positively charged NH_{2}^{+} ion called a nitrenium ion, but both of these are very unstable.

== See also ==
- Imide
