= Acetyl bromide =

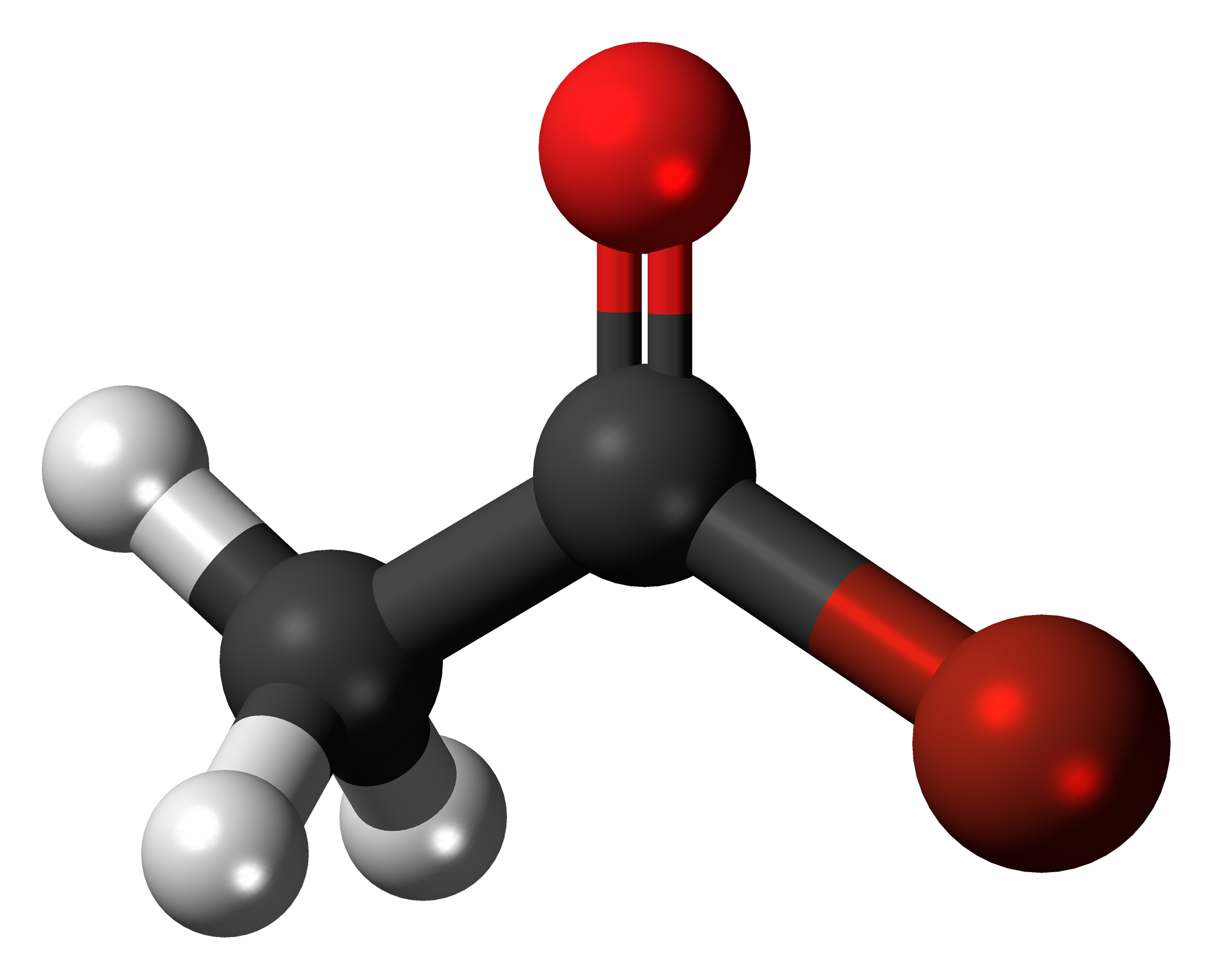

Names
- Preferred IUPAC name Acetyl bromide

Identifiers
CAS Number	506-96-7
3D model (JSmol)	Interactive image; Interactive image
ChemSpider	10050
ECHA InfoCard	100.007.329
EC Number	208-061-7
PubChem CID	10482
RTECS number	AO5955000
UNII	O18V5XYO0G
UN number	1716
CompTox Dashboard (EPA)	DTXSID5060140
- InChI: InChI=1S/C2H3BrO/c1-2(3)4/h1H3 Key: FXXACINHVKSMDR-UHFFFAOYSA-N; InChI=1/C2H3BrO/c1-2(3)4/h1H3 Key: FXXACINHVKSMDR-UHFFFAOYAZ
- SMILES: CC(=O)Br; BrC(=O)C

Properties
Chemical formula	C_{2}H_{3}BrO
Molar mass	122.949 g·mol^{−1}
Density	1.663 g/mL
Melting point	−96 °C (−141 °F; 177 K)
Boiling point	75 to 77 °C (167 to 171 °F; 348 to 350 K)

Hazards
- GHS labelling
Pictograms	(GHS05: Corrosive)
Signal word	Danger
Hazard statements	H314
Precautionary statements	P260, P264, P280, P301+P330+P331, P303+P361+P353, P304+P340, P305+P351+P338, P310, P321, P363, P405, P501
Flash point	110 °C (230 °F; 383 K)
Safety data sheet (SDS)	ILO MSDS
- Except where otherwise noted, data are given for materials in their standard state (at 25 °C [77 °F], 100 kPa). verify (what is ?) Infobox references

Acetyl bromide is an acyl bromide compound. As is expected, it may be prepared by reaction between phosphorus tribromide and acetic acid:

3 CH_{3}COOH + PBr_{3} → 3 CH_{3}COBr + H_{3}PO_{3}

As usual for an acid halide, acetyl bromide hydrolyzes rapidly in water, forming acetic acid and hydrobromic acid. It also reacts with alcohols and amines to produce acetate esters and acetamides, respectively.
