= Methyl acetate =

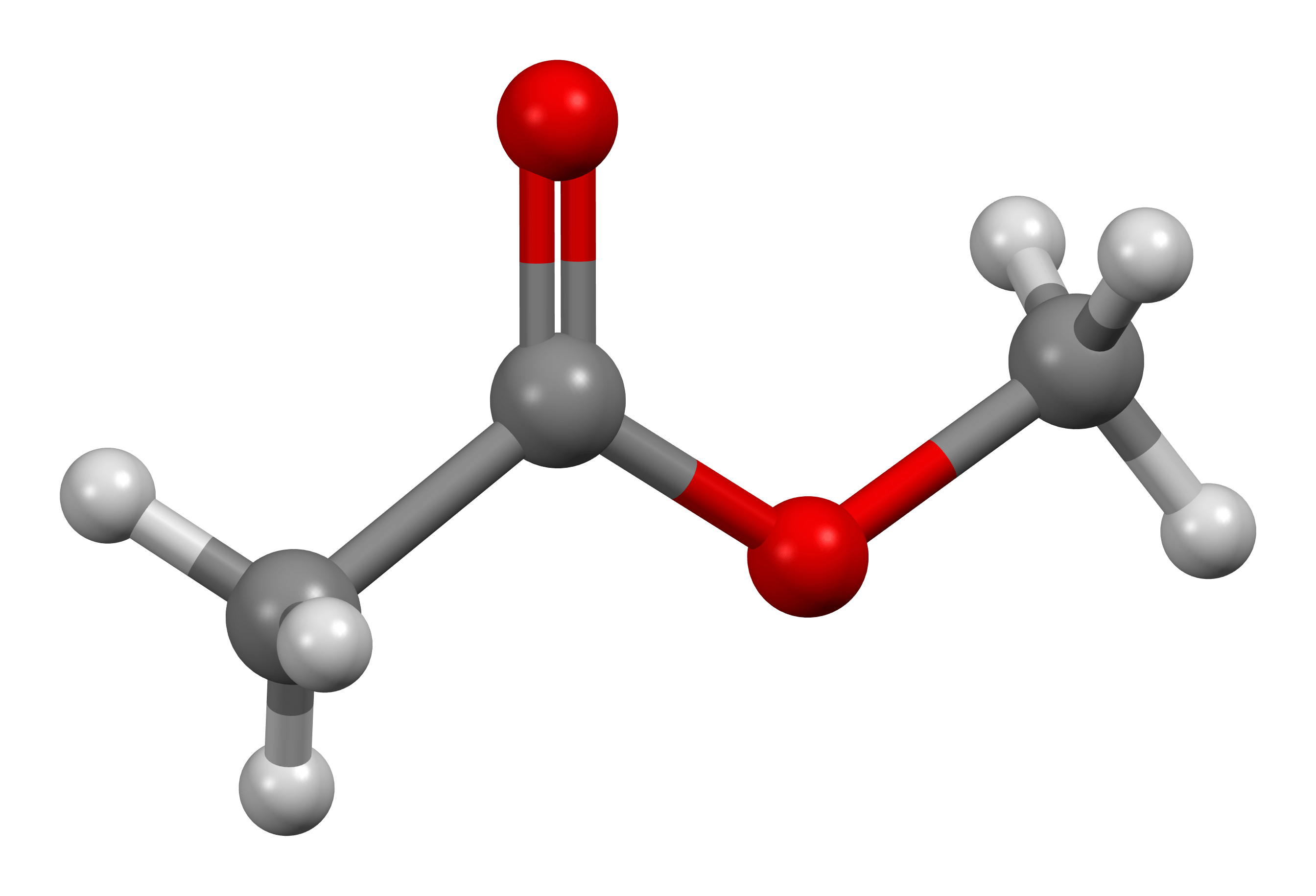

Names
- Preferred IUPAC name Methyl acetate
- Systematic IUPAC name Methyl ethanoate
- Other names Methyl ester of acetic acid

Identifiers
CAS Number	79-20-9
3D model (JSmol)	Interactive image
ChEBI	CHEBI:77700
ChEMBL	ChEMBL14079
ChemSpider	6335
ECHA InfoCard	100.001.078
KEGG	C17530
PubChem CID	6584
UNII	W684QT396F
CompTox Dashboard (EPA)	DTXSID301030166 DTXSID4021767, DTXSID301030166
- InChI: InChI=1S/C3H6O2/c1-3(4)5-2/h1-2H3 Key: KXKVLQRXCPHEJC-UHFFFAOYSA-N; InChI=1/C3H6O2/c1-3(4)5-2/h1-2H3 Key: KXKVLQRXCPHEJC-UHFFFAOYAV
- SMILES: O=C(OC)C

Properties
Chemical formula	C_{3}H_{6}O_{2}
Molar mass	74.079 g·mol^{−1}
Appearance	Colorless liquid
Odor	Fragrant, fruity
Density	0.932 g cm^{−3}
Melting point	−98 °C (−144 °F; 175 K)
Boiling point	56.9 °C (134.4 °F; 330.0 K)
Solubility in water	~25% (20 °C)
Vapor pressure	173 mmHg (20°C)
Magnetic susceptibility (χ)	-42.60·10^{−6} cm^{3}/mol
Refractive index (n_{D})	1.361

Hazards
NFPA 704 (fire diamond)	2 3
Flash point	−10 °C; 14 °F; 263 K
Explosive limits	3.1%-16%
- Lethal dose or concentration (LD, LC)
LD_{50} (median dose)	3700 mg/kg (oral, rabbit)
LC_{Lo} (lowest published)	11,039 ppm (mouse, 4 hr); 21,753 ppm (cat, 1 hr); 32,000 ppm (rat, 4 hr)
- NIOSH (US health exposure limits)
PEL (Permissible)	TWA 200 ppm (610 mg/m^{3})
REL (Recommended)	TWA 200 ppm (610 mg/m^{3}) ST 250 ppm (760 mg/m^{3})
IDLH (Immediate danger)	3100 ppm
Safety data sheet (SDS)	External MSDS

Related compounds
Related esters	Methyl formate Ethyl acetate Ethyl formate Methyl fluoroacetate
- Except where otherwise noted, data are given for materials in their standard state (at 25 °C [77 °F], 100 kPa). verify (what is ?) Infobox references

Methyl acetate, also known as MeOAc, acetic acid methyl ester or methyl ethanoate, is a carboxylate ester with the formula CH_{3}COOCH_{3}. It is a flammable liquid with a characteristically pleasant smell reminiscent of some glues and nail polish removers. Methyl acetate is occasionally used as a solvent, being weakly polar and lipophilic, but its close relative ethyl acetate is a more common solvent, being less toxic and less soluble in water. Methyl acetate has a solubility of 25% in water at room temperature. At elevated temperature its solubility in water is much higher. Methyl acetate is not stable in the presence of strong aqueous bases or aqueous acids. Methyl acetate is not regulated as a volatile organic compound in the USA.

== Preparation and reactions ==
Methyl acetate is produced industrially via the carbonylation of methanol as a byproduct of the production of acetic acid. Methyl acetate also arises by esterification of acetic acid with methanol in the presence of strong acids such as sulfuric acid; this production process is famous because of Eastman Kodak's intensified process using a reactive distillation.

=== Reactions ===
In the presence of strong bases such as sodium hydroxide or strong acids such as hydrochloric acid or sulfuric acid it is hydrolyzed back into methanol and acetic acid, especially at elevated temperature. The conversion of methyl acetate back into its components, by an acid, is a first-order reaction with respect to the ester. The reaction of methyl acetate and a base, for example sodium hydroxide, is a second-order reaction with respect to both reactants.

Methyl acetate is a Lewis base that forms 1:1 adducts with a variety of Lewis acids. It is classified as a hard base and is a base in the ECW model with E_{B} =1.63 and C_{B} = 0.95.

== Applications ==
A major use of methyl acetate is as a volatile low toxicity solvent in glues, paints, and nail polish removers.

Methyl acetate has an ethereal odour (ethereal, sweet, fruity, solvent, estery, winey, cognac, rummy).

Acetic anhydride is produced by carbonylation of methyl acetate in a process that was inspired by the Monsanto acetic acid synthesis.

== See also ==
- Ethyl acetate
