= Iodomethane =

- Stereo skeletal formula of iodomethane with all explicit hydrogens added

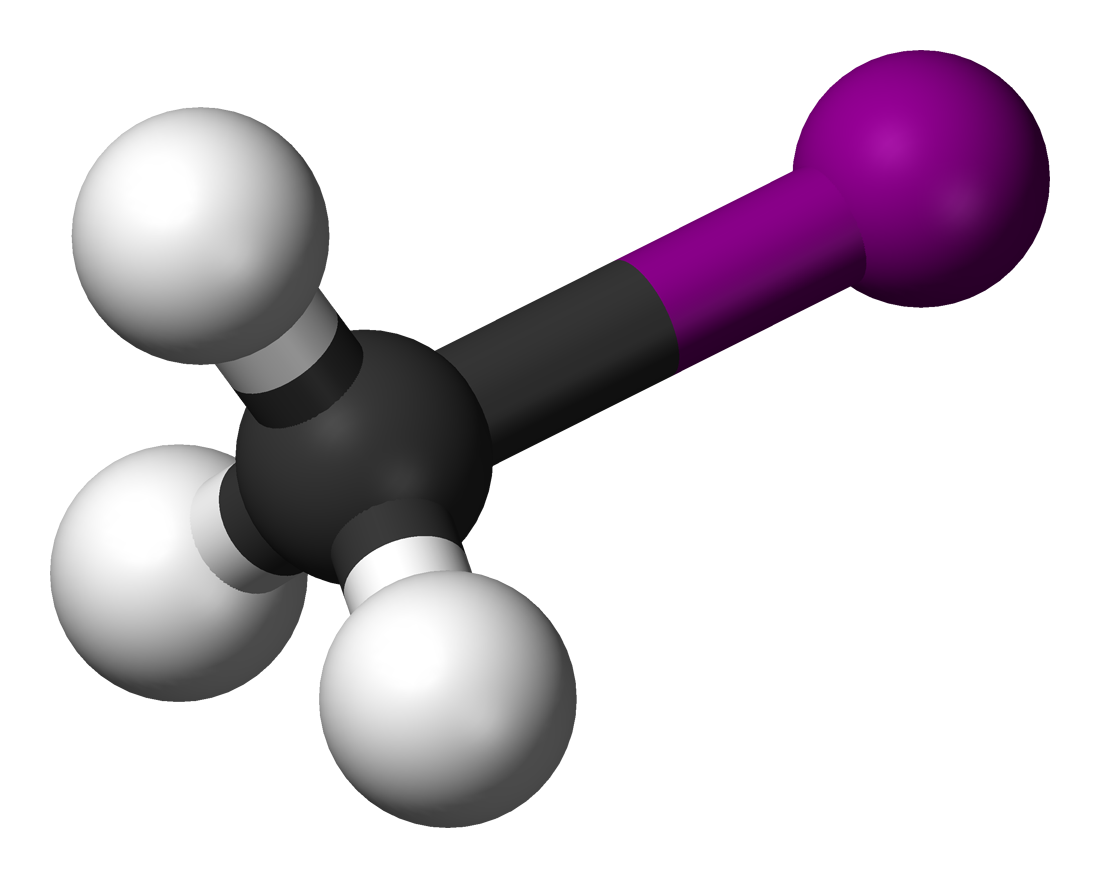
Ball and stick model of iodomethane
Spacefill model of iodomethane

Names
- Preferred IUPAC name Iodomethane
- Other names: Methyl iodide; Methyl iodine; Monoiodomethane

Identifiers
CAS Number	74-88-4
3D model (JSmol)	Interactive image
Abbreviations	Halon 10001; MeI
Beilstein Reference	969135
ChEBI	CHEBI:39282
ChEMBL	ChEMBL115849
ChemSpider	6088
ECHA InfoCard	100.000.745
EC Number	200-819-5
Gmelin Reference	1233
KEGG	C18448
MeSH	methyl+iodide
PubChem CID	6328
RTECS number	PA9450000
UNII	DAT010ZJSR
UN number	2644
CompTox Dashboard (EPA)	DTXSID0024187
- InChI: InChI=1S/CH3I/c1-2/h1H3 Key: INQOMBQAUSQDDS-UHFFFAOYSA-N
- SMILES: CI

Properties
Chemical formula	CH_{3}I
Molar mass	141.939 g·mol^{−1}
Appearance	Colorless liquid
Odor	Pungent, ether-like
Density	2.28 g/mL
Melting point	−66.5 °C; −87.6 °F; 206.7 K
Boiling point	42.4 to 42.8 °C; 108.2 to 108.9 °F; 315.5 to 315.9 K
Solubility in water	14 g/L (at 20 °C, 68 °F)
log P	1.609
Vapor pressure	54.4 kPa (at 20 °C, 68 °F)
Henry's law constant (k_{H})	1.4 μmol/(Pa·kg)
Magnetic susceptibility (χ)	−57.2×10^{−6} cm^{3}/mol
Refractive index (n_{D})	1.530–1.531

Structure
Molecular shape	Tetrahedron

Thermochemistry
Heat capacity (C)	82.75 J/(K·mol)
Std enthalpy of formation (Δ_{f}H^{⦵}_{298})	−14.1 to −13.1 kJ/mol
Std enthalpy of combustion (Δ_{c}H^{⦵}_{298})	−808.9 to −808.3 kJ/mol

Hazards
- GHS labelling
Pictograms	(GHS06: Toxic) (GHS08: Health hazard)
Signal word	Danger
Hazard statements	H301, H312, H315, H331, H335, H351
Precautionary statements	P261, P280, P301+P310, P311
NFPA 704 (fire diamond)	3 0 0
- Lethal dose or concentration (LD, LC)
LD_{50} (median dose)	76 mg/kg (oral, rat); 800 mg/kg (dermal, guinea pig)
LC_{50} (median concentration)	1550 ppm (rat, 30 min); 860 ppm (mouse, 57 min); 220 ppm (rat, 4 hr)
LC_{Lo} (lowest published)	3800 ppm (rat, 15 min)
- NIOSH (US health exposure limits)
PEL (Permissible)	TWA 5 ppm (28 mg/m^{3}) [skin]
REL (Recommended)	Ca TWA 2 ppm (10 mg/m^{3}) [skin]
IDLH (Immediate danger)	Ca [100 ppm]

Related compounds
Related iodomethanes	Methane; Diiodomethane; Iodoform; Carbon tetraiodide
- Except where otherwise noted, data are given for materials in their standard state (at 25 °C [77 °F], 100 kPa). verify (what is ?) Infobox references

Iodomethane, also called methyl iodide, and commonly abbreviated "MeI", is the chemical compound with the formula CH_{3}I. It is a dense, colorless, volatile liquid. In terms of chemical structure, it is related to methane by replacement of one hydrogen atom by an atom of iodine. It is naturally emitted in small amounts by rice plantations. It is also produced in vast quantities estimated to be greater than 214,000 tons annually by algae and kelp in the world's temperate oceans, and in lesser amounts on land by terrestrial fungi and bacteria. It is used in organic synthesis as a source of methyl groups.

== Preparation and handling ==
Iodomethane is formed via the exothermic reaction that occurs when iodine is added to a mixture of methanol with red phosphorus. The iodinating reagent is phosphorus triiodide that is formed in situ:

3 CH_{3}OH + PI_{3} → 3 CH_{3}I + H_{2}PO_{3}H

Alternatively, it is prepared from the reaction of dimethyl sulfate with potassium iodide in the presence of calcium carbonate:

(CH_{3}O)_{2}SO_{2} + KI → CH_{3}I + CH_{3}OSO_{2}OK

Iodomethane can also be prepared by the reaction of methanol with aqueous hydrogen iodide:

CH_{3}OH + HI → CH_{3}I + H_{2}O

The generated iodomethane can be distilled from the reaction mixture.

Iodomethane may also be prepared by treating iodoform with potassium hydroxide and dimethyl sulfate under 95% ethanol.

In the Tennessee Eastman acetic anhydride process iodomethane is formed as an intermediate product by a catalytic reaction between methyl acetate and lithium iodide.

=== Storage and purification ===
Like many organoiodide compounds, iodomethane is typically stored in dark bottles to inhibit degradation caused by light to give iodine, giving degraded samples a purplish tinge. Commercial samples may be stabilized by copper or silver wire. It can be purified by washing with Na_{2}S_{2}O_{3} to remove iodine followed by distillation.

=== Biogenic iodomethane ===
Most iodomethane is produced by microbial methylation of iodide. Oceans are the major source, but rice paddies are also significant.

== Reactions ==
=== Methylation reagent ===
Iodomethane is useful as a reagent for methylation because it is excellent substrate for S_{N}2 substitution reactions. It is sterically open for attack by nucleophiles, and iodide is a good leaving group. It is used for alkylating carbon, oxygen, sulfur, nitrogen, and phosphorus nucleophiles. Unfortunately, it has a high equivalent weight: one mole of iodomethane weighs almost three times as much as one mole of chloromethane and nearly 1.5 times as much as one mole of bromomethane. On the other hand, chloromethane and bromomethane are gaseous, thus harder to handle, and are also weaker alkylating agents. Iodide can act as a catalyst when reacting chloromethane or bromomethane with a nucleophile while iodomethane is formed in situ.

Iodides are generally expensive relative to the more common chlorides and bromides, though iodomethane is reasonably affordable; on a commercial scale, the more toxic dimethyl sulfate is preferred, since it is cheap and has a higher boiling point. The iodide leaving group in iodomethane may cause unwanted side reactions. Finally, being highly reactive, iodomethane is more dangerous for laboratory workers than related chlorides and bromides.

For example, it can be used for the methylation of carboxylic acids or phenols:

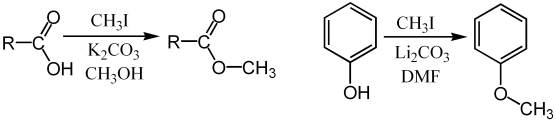

In these examples, the base (K_{2}CO_{3} or Li_{2}CO_{3}) removes the acidic proton to form the carboxylate or phenoxide anion, which serves as the nucleophile in the S_{N}2 substitution.

Iodide is a soft anion, which means that methylation with MeI tends to occur at the softer end of an ambidentate nucleophile. For example, reaction with thiocyanate ion favors attack by the softer sulfur rather than harder nitrogen, leading mainly to methyl thiocyanate (CH_{3}SCN) rather than methyl isothiocyanate (CH_{3}NCS). This behavior is relevant to the methylation of stabilized enolates such as those derived from 1,3-dicarbonyl compounds. Methylation of these and related enolates can occur on the harder oxygen atom or the softer carbon atom. With iodomethane, C-alkylation nearly always predominates. The result is a practical method for carbon–carbon bond formation rather than giving enol ethers.

=== Other reactions ===
In the Monsanto process and the Cativa process, MeI forms in situ from the reaction of methanol and hydrogen iodide. The CH_{3}I then reacts with carbon monoxide in the presence of a rhodium or iridium complex to form acetyl iodide, the precursor to acetic acid after hydrolysis. The Cativa process is usually preferred because less water is required to use and there are less byproducts.

MeI is used to prepare methylmagnesium iodide (MeMgI), a Grignard reagent that is a common source of Me^{−} for nucleophilic reactions. The use of MeMgI has been somewhat superseded by the commercially available methyllithium. MeI can also be used to prepare dimethylmercury, by reacting 2 moles of MeI with a 2/1-molar sodium amalgam (2 moles of sodium, 1 mol of mercury).

Iodomethane and other organoiodine compounds form under the conditions of serious nuclear accidents. After the Chernobyl disaster and Fukushima Daiichi nuclear disaster, iodine-131 was detected in organoiodine compounds in Europe and Japan respectively.

== Trideuteroiodomethane ==
Trideuteroiodomethane (CD_{3}I) is an isotopologue of iodomethane in which the three hydrogen atoms are deuterium atoms (^{2}H rather than ^{1}H). Due to the value of the trideuteromethyl group in medicinal chemistry, CD_{3}I is a useful reagent for synthesizing potentially biologically active chemicals. Several specialized reactions have been developed for its use under especially mild reaction conditions on a variety of substrates.

== Use as a pesticide ==
Iodomethane had also been proposed for use as a fungicide, herbicide, insecticide, nematicide, and as a soil disinfectant, replacing methyl bromide (also known as bromomethane) (banned under the Montreal Protocol). Manufactured by Arysta LifeScience and sold under the brand name MIDAS, iodomethane is registered as a pesticide in the U.S., Mexico, Morocco, Japan, Turkey, and New Zealand and registration is pending in Australia, Guatemala, Costa Rica, Chile, Egypt, Israel, South Africa and other countries.

=== United States ===
Iodomethane was approved for use as a pesticide by the United States Environmental Protection Agency in 2007 as a pre-plant biocide used to control insects, plant parasitic nematodes, soil borne pathogens, and weed seeds. The compound was registered for use as a preplant soil treatment for field grown strawberries, peppers, tomatoes, grape vines, ornamentals and turf and nursery grown strawberries, stone fruits, tree nuts, and conifer trees.

The use of iodomethane as a fumigant has drawn concern. For example, 54 chemists and physicians contacted the U.S. EPA in a letter, saying "We are skeptical of U.S. EPA's conclusion that the high levels of exposure to iodomethane that are likely to result from broadcast applications are 'acceptable' risks. U.S. EPA has made many assumptions about toxicology and exposure in the risk assessment that have not been examined by independent scientific peer reviewers for adequacy or accuracy. Additionally, none of U.S. EPA's calculations account for the extra vulnerability of the unborn fetus and children to toxic insults." EPA Assistant Administrator Jim Gulliford replied with a letter detailing the risk analysis performed and the procedures for approval, concluding, "We are confident that by conducting such a rigorous analysis and developing highly restrictive provisions governing its use, there will be no risks of concern," and in October 2007 the EPA approved the use of iodomethane as a soil fumigant in the United States.

==== California ====
The California Department of Pesticide Regulation (DPR) concluded that iodomethane is "highly toxic", that "any anticipated scenario for the agricultural or structural fumigation use of this agent would result in exposures to a large number of the public and thus would have a significant adverse impact on the public health", and that adequate control of the chemical in these circumstances would be "difficult, if not impossible". Iodomethane was approved as a pesticide in California in December of 2010. A lawsuit was filed on January 5, 2011, challenging California's approval of iodomethane. The first commercial applications of iodomethane soil fumigant in California began in Fresno County in May 2011. On March 20, 2012, the manufacturer withdrew the fumigant and requested that California Department of Pesticide Regulation cancel its California registration, citing its lack of market viability.

== Safety ==
=== Toxicity and biological effects ===
According to the United States Department of Agriculture iodomethane exhibits moderate to high acute toxicity for inhalation and ingestion. The Centers for Disease Control and Prevention (CDC) lists inhalation, skin absorption, ingestion, and eye contact as possible exposure routes with target organs of the eyes, skin, respiratory system, and the central nervous system. Symptoms may include eye irritation, nausea, vomiting, dizziness, ataxia, slurred speech, and dermatitis. In high dose acute toxicity, as may occur in industrial accidents, toxicity includes metabolic disturbance, renal failure, venous and arterial thrombosis and encephalopathy with seizures and coma, with a characteristic pattern of brain injury.

Iodomethane has an LD_{50} for oral administration to rats 76 mg/kg, and is rapidly converted in the liver to S-methylglutathione.

In its risk assessment of iodomethane, the U.S. EPA conducted an exhaustive scientific and medical literature search over the past 100 years for reported cases of human poisonings attributable to the compound. Citing the EPA as its source, the California Department of Pesticide Regulation said: "Over the past century, only 11 incidents of iodomethane poisoning have been reported in the published literature." "An updated literature search on May 30, 2007 for iodomethane poisoning produced only one additional case report." All but one were industrial—not agricultural—accidents, and the remaining case of poisoning was an apparent suicide. Iodomethane is routinely and regularly used in industrial processes as well as in most university and college chemistry departments for study and learning related to a variety of organic chemical reactions.

In 2024, a case of a person being injected with iodomethane emerged. The subject, who was the victim of attempted murder by a general practitioner disguised as a community nurse, went on to develop necrotizing fasciitis but survived.

=== Carcinogenicity in mammals ===
The U.S. National Institute for Occupational Safety and Health (NIOSH), the U.S. Occupational Safety and Health Administration and the U.S. Centers for Disease Control and Prevention consider iodomethane a potential occupational carcinogen.

The International Agency for Research on Cancer concluded based on studies performed after methyl iodide was put on the Proposition 65 list that: "Methyl iodide is not classifiable as to its carcinogenicity to humans (Group 3)." As of 2007 the Environmental Protection Agency classifies it as "not likely to be carcinogenic to humans in the absence of altered thyroid hormone homeostasis," i.e. it is a human carcinogen but only at doses large enough to disrupt thyroid function (via excess iodide). However this finding is disputed by the Pesticide Action Network, which states that the EPA's assessment "appears to be based solely on a single rat inhalation study in which 66% of the control group and 54–62% of the rats in the other groups died before the end of the study". They go on to state: "The EPA appears to be dismissing early peer-reviewed studies in favor of two nonpeer-reviewed studies conducted by the registrant that are flawed in design and execution." Despite requests by the U.S. EPA to the Pesticide Action Network to bring forth scientific evidence of their claims, they have not done so.

== See also ==
- Angelita C. et al. v. California Department of Pesticide Regulation

== Additional sources ==
- March, Jerry (1992). Advanced Organic Chemistry: Reactions, Mechanisms, and Structure (4th ed.). New York: Wiley. ISBN 0-471-60180-2.
- Bolt H. M.; Gansewendt B. (1993). "Mechanisms of carcinogenicity of methyl halides". Crit Rev Toxicol. 23 (3): 237–53. doi:10.3109/10408449309105011. PMID 8260067.
