= Acetyl group =

Chemical group, –C(=O)CH3

- Skeletal formula of acetyl with all implicit hydrogens shown

Names
- IUPAC name Acetyl (preferred to ethanoyl)
- Systematic IUPAC name Methyloxidocarbon(•) (additive)

Identifiers
CAS Number	3170-69-2
3D model (JSmol)	Interactive image
Abbreviations	Ac
Beilstein Reference	1697938
ChEBI	CHEBI:46887
ChemSpider	121499
Gmelin Reference	786
PubChem CID	137849
- InChI: InChI=1S/C2H3O/c1-2-3/h1H3 Key: TUCNEACPLKLKNU-UHFFFAOYSA-N
- SMILES: C[C]=O

Properties
Chemical formula	C_{2}H_{3}O
Molar mass	43.045 g·mol^{−1}

Thermochemistry
Std enthalpy of formation (Δ_{f}H^{⦵}_{298})	−15 to −9 kJ mol^{−1}

Related compounds
Related compounds	Acetone; Carbon monoxide Acetic acid
- Except where otherwise noted, data are given for materials in their standard state (at 25 °C [77 °F], 100 kPa). verify (what is ?) Infobox references

In organic chemistry, an acetyl group is a functional group denoted by the chemical formula −COCH_{3} and the structure −C(=O)−CH_{3}. It is sometimes represented by the symbol Ac (not to be confused with the element actinium). In IUPAC nomenclature, an acetyl group is called an ethanoyl group.

An acetyl group contains a methyl group (−CH_{3}) that is single-bonded to a carbonyl (C=O), making it an acyl group.

The acetyl moiety is a component of many organic compounds, including acetic acid, the neurotransmitter acetylcholine, acetyl-CoA, acetylcysteine, acetaminophen (also known as paracetamol), and acetylsalicylic acid (also known as aspirin).

== Acetylation ==
Acetylation is the chemical reaction known as "ethanoylation" in the IUPAC nomenclature. It depicts a reactionary process that injects an acetyl functional group into a chemical compound. The opposite reaction is called "deacetylation", and this is the removal of the acetyl group. An example of an acetylation reaction is the conversion of glycine to N-acetylglycine:

H_{2}NCH_{2}CO_{2}H + (CH_{3}CO)_{2}O → CH_{3}C(O)NHCH_{2}CO_{2}H + CH_{3}CO_{2}H

=== In biology ===
Enzymes which perform acetylation on proteins or other biomolecules are known as acetyltransferases. In biological organisms, acetyl groups are commonly transferred from acetyl-CoA to other organic molecules. Acetyl-CoA is an intermediate in the biological synthesis and in the breakdown of many organic molecules. Acetyl-CoA is also created during the second stage of cellular respiration (pyruvate decarboxylation) by the action of pyruvate dehydrogenase on pyruvic acid.

Proteins are often modified via acetylation, for various purposes. For example, acetylation of histones by histone acetyltransferases (HATs) results in an expansion of local chromatin structure, allowing transcription to occur by enabling RNA polymerase to access DNA. However, removal of the acetyl group by histone deacetylases (HDACs) condenses the local chromatin structure, thereby preventing transcription.

=== In synthetic organic and pharmaceutical chemistry ===
Acetylation can be achieved by chemists using a variety of methods, most commonly with the use of acetic anhydride or acetyl chloride, often in the presence of a tertiary or aromatic amine base. Acetic anhydride and acetyl chloride are good candidates for acetylation for two reasons: the electrophilicity of the carbonyl carbon of the acetyl group is enhanced by the electron-withdrawing inductive effect of the neighbouring group (acetoxy- and chloro-, respectively), and the leaving group is stable or stabilised through resonance (acetate and chloride, respectively). The amine base is primarily used to capture free protons, but may also further activate the acetyl group towards nucleophilic attack.

For example, salicylic acid can be acetylated by acetic anhydride to form aspirin:

== Pharmacology ==
Acetylated organic molecules exhibit increased ability to cross the selectively permeable blood–brain barrier. Acetylation helps a given drug reach the brain more quickly, making the drug's effects more intense and increasing the effectiveness of a given dose. The acetyl group in acetylsalicylic acid (aspirin) enhances its effectiveness relative to the natural anti-inflammatant salicylic acid. In similar manner, acetylation converts the natural painkiller morphine into the far more potent heroin (diacetylmorphine).

There is some evidence that acetyl-L-carnitine may be more effective for some applications than L-carnitine. Acetylation of resveratrol holds promise as one of the first anti-radiation medicines for human populations.

== Etymology ==
The term "acetyl" was coined by the German chemist Justus von Liebig in 1839 to describe what is now known as the vinyl group (coined in 1851). He and others before him regarded this group (groups were called radicals at that time) as the basis for other C2 compounds including acetic acid (the main component of vinegar, aside from water), Later the name was carried over to the MeCO-group used today, but the name of acetylene (coined in 1860) was retained. "Acetyl" is derived from the Latin acētum, meaning "vinegar", and the Greek ύλη hū́lē, meaning "substance" or "material".

== See also ==
- Acetaldehyde
- Acetoxy group
- Histone acetylation and deacetylation
- Polyoxymethylene plastic (acetal resin), a thermoplastic
