= Catalytic cycle =

Multistep reaction mechanism involving a catalyst

In chemistry, a catalytic cycle is a multistep reaction mechanism that involves a catalyst. The catalytic cycle is the main method for describing the role of catalysts in biochemistry, organometallic chemistry, bioinorganic chemistry, materials science, etc.

Since catalysts are regenerated, catalytic cycles are usually written as a sequence of chemical reactions in the form of a loop. In such loops, the initial step entails binding of one or more reactants by the catalyst, and the final step is the release of the product and regeneration of the catalyst. Articles on the Monsanto process, the Wacker process, and the Heck reaction show catalytic cycles.

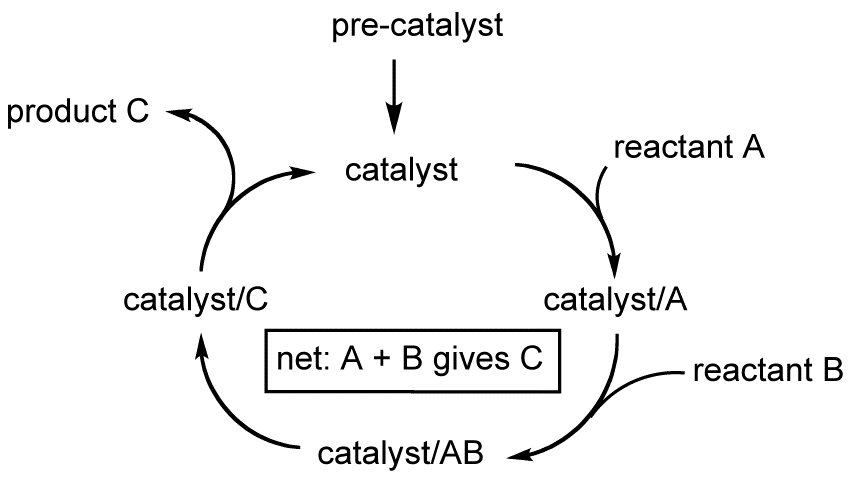
Catalytic cycle for conversion of A and B into C

A catalytic cycle is not necessarily a full reaction mechanism. For example, it may be that the intermediates have been detected, but it is not known by which mechanisms the actual elementary reactions occur.

== Precatalysts ==
Precatalysts are not catalysts but are precursors to catalysts. Precatalysts are converted in the reactor to the actual catalytic species. The identification of catalysts vs precatalysts is an important theme in catalysis research.

The conversion of a precatalyst to a catalyst is often called catalyst activation. Many metal halides are precatalysts for alkene polymerization, see Kaminsky catalyst and Ziegler-Natta catalysis. The precatalysts, e.g. titanium trichloride, are activated by organoaluminium compounds, which function as catalyst activators. Metal oxides are often classified as catalysts, but in fact are almost always precatalysts. Applications include olefin metathesis and hydrogenation. The metal oxides require some activating reagent, usually a reducing agent, to enter the catalytic cycle.

Often catalytic cycles show the conversion of a precatalyst to the catalyst.

== Sacrificial catalysts ==
Often a so-called sacrificial catalyst is also part of the reaction system with the purpose of regenerating the true catalyst in each cycle. As the name implies, the sacrificial catalyst is not regenerated and is irreversibly consumed, thereby not a catalyst at all. This sacrificial compound is also known as a stoichiometric catalyst when added in stoichiometric quantities compared to the main reactant. Usually the true catalyst is an expensive and complex molecule and added in quantities as small as possible. The stoichiometric catalyst on the other hand should be cheap and abundant. "Sacrificial catalysts" are more accurately referred to by their actual role in the catalytic cycle, for example as a reductant.
