= Acyl halide =

Class of organic compounds

Acyl Halide

An acyl halide (also known as an acid halide) is a chemical compound derived from an oxoacid by replacing a hydroxyl group (−OH) with a halide group (−X, where X is a halogen).

In organic chemistry, the term typically refers to acyl halides of carboxylic acids (−C(=O)OH), which contain a −C(=O)X functional group consisting of a carbonyl group (C=O) singly bonded to a halogen atom. The general formula for such an acyl halide can be written RCOX, where R may be, for example, an alkyl group, CO is the carbonyl group, and X represents the halide, such as chloride. Acyl chlorides are the most commonly encountered acyl halides, but acetyl iodide is the one produced (transiently) on the largest scale. Billions of kilograms are generated annually in the production of acetic acid.

== Preparation ==
=== Aliphatic acyl halides ===
On an industrial scale, the reaction of acetic anhydride with hydrogen chloride produces a mixture of acetyl chloride and acetic acid:

(CH_{3}CO)_{2}O + HCl → CH_{3}COCl + CH_{3}CO_{2}H

Common syntheses of acyl chlorides also entail the reaction of carboxylic acids with phosgene, thionyl chloride, and phosphorus trichloride Phosphorus pentabromide is used for acyl bromides, which are rarely of value.

=== Aromatic acyl chlorides ===
Benzoyl chloride is produced from benzotrichloride using either water or benzoic acid:

C_{6}H_{5}CCl_{3} + H_{2}O → C_{6}H_{5}COCl + 2 HCl
C_{6}H_{5}CCl_{3} + C_{6}H_{5}CO_{2}H → 2 C_{6}H_{5}COCl + HCl

As with other acyl chlorides, it can be generated from the parent acid and other chlorinating agents phosphorus pentachloride or thionyl chloride.

Representative laboratory routes to aromatic acyl halides are comparable to those for aliphatic acyl halides. For example, chloroformylation, a specific type of Friedel-Crafts acylation which uses formaldehyde as a reagent, or by the direct chlorination of benzaldehyde derivatives.

=== Acyl bromides and iodides ===
Acyl bromides and iodides are less common. Triphenylphosphine dibromide ((C_{6}H_{5})_{3}PBr_{2}) has been used to give acyl bromides. Acyl iodides have been prepared using silyl iodides.

== Reactions ==
Acyl halides are rather reactive compounds often synthesized to be used as intermediates in the synthesis of other organic compounds. For example, an acyl halide can react with:

- water, to form a carboxylic acid. This hydrolysis is the most heavily exploited reaction for acyl halides as it occurs in the industrial synthesis of acetic acid.

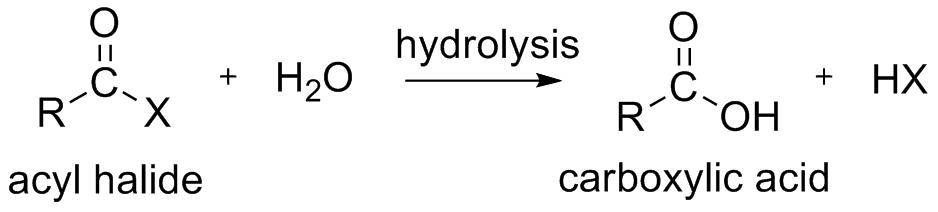

- an alcohol to form an ester

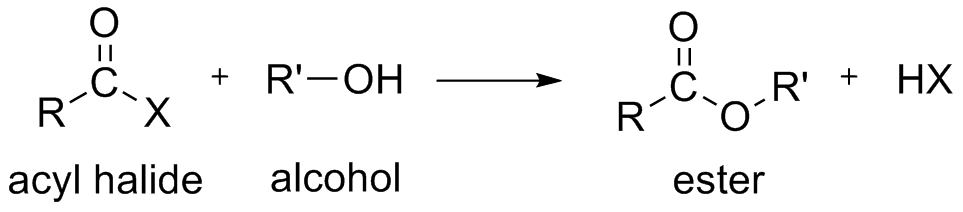

- an amine to form an amide

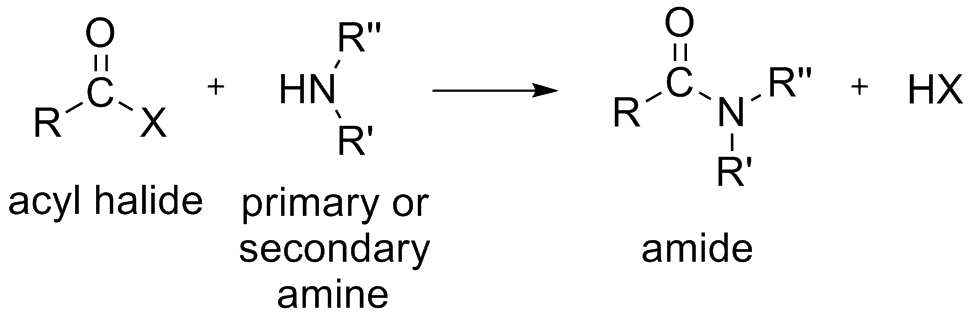

- an aromatic compound, using a Lewis acid catalyst such as AlCl_{3}, to form an aromatic ketone. See Friedel-Crafts acylation.
- carboxylic acids to form an organic acid anhydrides.

In the above reactions, HX (hydrogen halide or hydrohalic acid) is also formed. For example, if the acyl halide is an acyl chloride, HCl (hydrogen chloride or hydrochloric acid) is also formed.

== Multiple functional groups ==
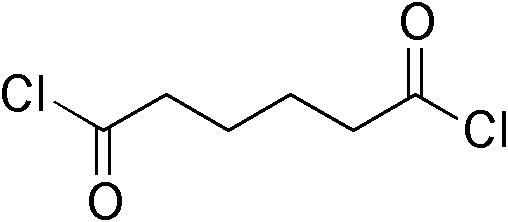
Adipoyl chloride

A molecule can have more than one acyl halide functional group. For example, "adipoyl dichloride", usually simply called adipoyl chloride, has two acyl chloride functional groups; see the structure at right. It is the dichloride (i.e., double chloride) of the 6-carbon dicarboxylic acid adipic acid. An important use of adipoyl chloride is polymerization with an organic di-amino compound to form a polyamide called nylon or polymerization with certain other organic compounds to form polyesters.

Phosgene (carbonyl dichloride, Cl–CO–Cl) is a very toxic gas that is the dichloride of carbonic acid (HO–CO–OH). Both chlorine atoms in phosgene can undergo reactions analogous to the preceding reactions of acyl halides. Phosgene is used a reactant in the production of polycarbonate polymers, among other industrial applications.

== General hazards ==
Volatile acyl halides are lachrymatory because they can react with water at the surface of the eye producing hydrohalic and organic acids irritating to the eye. Similar problems can result if one inhales acyl halide vapors. In general, acyl halides (even non-volatile compounds such as tosyl chloride) are irritants to the eyes, skin and mucous membranes.
