= Carbonylation =

Chemical reaction which adds a C=O group onto a molecule

In chemistry, carbonylation refers to reactions that introduce carbon monoxide (CO) into organic and inorganic substrates. Carbon monoxide is abundantly available and conveniently reactive, so it is widely used as a reactant in industrial chemistry. The term carbonylation also refers to oxidation of protein side chains.

== Organic chemistry ==
Several industrially useful organic chemicals are prepared by carbonylations, which can be highly selective reactions. Carbonylations produce organic carbonyls, i.e., compounds that contain the C=O functional group such as aldehydes (R−CH=O), carboxylic acids (R−C(=O)OH) and esters (R−C(=O)O−R'). Carbonylations are the basis of many types of reactions, including hydroformylation and Reppe reactions. These reactions require metal catalysts, which bind and activate the CO. These processes involve transition metal acyl complexes as intermediates. Much of this theme was developed by Walter Reppe.

=== Hydroformylation ===
Hydroformylation entails the addition of both carbon monoxide and hydrogen to unsaturated organic compounds, usually alkenes. The usual products are aldehydes:

RCH=CH_{2} + H_{2} + CO → RCH_{2}−CH_{2}−CHO

The reaction requires metal catalysts that bind CO, forming intermediate metal carbonyls. Many of the commodity carboxylic acids, i.e. propionic, butyric, valeric, etc, as well as many of the commodity alcohols, i.e. propanol, butanol, amyl alcohol, are derived from aldehydes produced by hydroformylation. In this way, hydroformylation is a gateway from alkenes to oxygenates.

=== Decarbonylation ===
Few organic carbonyls undergo spontaneous decarbonylation, but many can be induced to do so with appropriate catalysts. A common transformation involves the conversion of aldehydes to alkanes, usually catalyzed by metal complexes:

RCHO → RH + CO

Few catalysts are highly active or exhibit broad scope.

=== Acetic acid and acetic anhydride ===
Large-scale applications of carbonylation are the Monsanto acetic acid process and Cativa process, which convert methanol to acetic acid. In another major industrial process, acetic anhydride is prepared by a related carbonylation of methyl acetate.

=== Oxidative carbonylation ===
Dimethyl carbonate and dimethyl oxalate are produced industrially using carbon monoxide and an oxidant, in effect as a source of CO^{2+}:

4 CH_{3}OH + O_{2} + 2 CO → 2(CH_{3}O)_{2}CO + 2 H_{2}O

The oxidative carbonylation of methanol is catalyzed by copper(I) salts, which form transient carbonyl complexes. For the oxidative carbonylation of alkenes, palladium complexes are used.

=== Hydrocarboxylation, hydroxycarbonylation, and hydroesterification ===
In hydrocarboxylation, alkenes and alkynes are the substrates. This method is used to produce propionic acid from ethylene using nickel carbonyl as the catalyst:

RCH=CH_{2} + H_{2}O + CO → RCH_{2}−CH_{2}CO_{2}H

The above reaction is also referred to as hydroxycarbonylation, in which case hydrocarboxylation refers to the same net conversion. Acrylic acid was once mainly prepared by the hydrocarboxylation of acetylene.

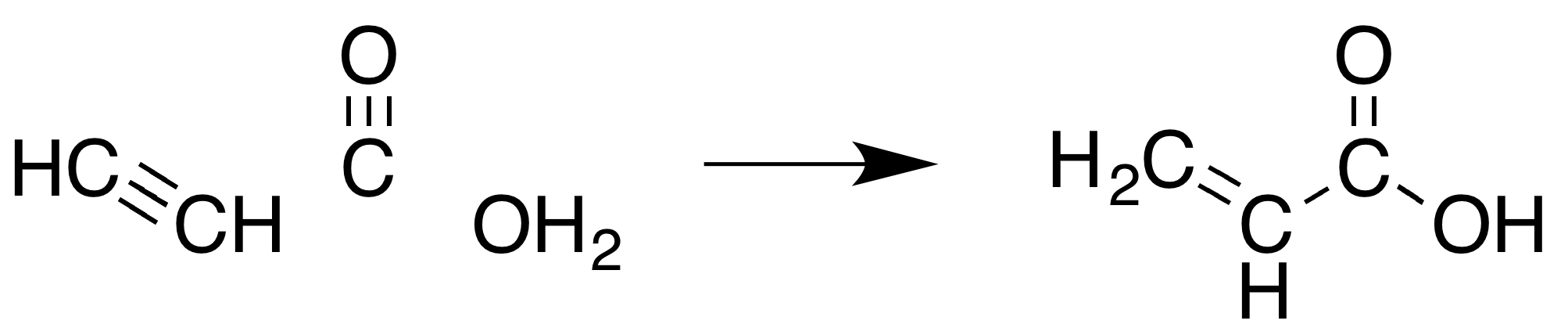
Synthesis of acrylic acid using "Reppe chemistry"; a metal catalyst is required.

A rare variant of the above chemistry entails the use of carbon dioxide and in place of CO and H_{2} in place of water:

C_{6}H_{5}CH=CH_{2} + H_{2} + CO_{2} → C_{6}H_{5}CH_{2}−CH_{2}CO_{2}H

Hydroesterification is similar to hydrocarboxylation, but it uses alcohols in place of water. For example, the carbomethoxylation of ethylene gives methyl propionate:

CH≡CH + CO + CH_{3}OH → CH_{3}−CH_{2}−C(=O)−OCH_{3}

The methyl propionate is a precursor to methyl methacrylate, a commercially important monomer. The process is catalyzed by Herrmann's catalyst, Pd[C_{6}H_{4}(CH_{2}PBu-t)_{2}]_{2}.

Alkyl, benzyl, vinyl, aryl, and allyl halides can also be carbonylated in the presence carbon monoxide and suitable catalysts such as manganese, iron, or nickel powders.

In the industrial synthesis of ibuprofen, a benzylic alcohol is converted to the corresponding arylacetic acid via a Pd-catalyzed carbonylation:

ArCH(CH_{3})OH + CO → ArCH(CH_{3})COOH

=== Koch carbonylation ===
The Koch reaction is a special case of hydrocarboxylation reaction that does not rely on metal catalysts. Instead, the process is catalyzed by strong acids such as sulfuric acid or the combination of phosphoric acid and boron trifluoride. The reaction is less applicable to simple alkenes. The industrial synthesis of glycolic acid is achieved in this way:

CH_{2}O + CO + H_{2}O → HOCH_{2}COOH

The conversion of isobutene to pivalic acid is also illustrative:

(CH_{3})_{2}C=CH_{2} + H_{2}O +CO → (CH_{3})_{3}C−COOH

Some hydrocarbons undergo this reaction, provided that they form tertiary carbocations.

=== Formates and formamides ===
Methanol is converted to methyl formate by carbonylation in the presence of a strong base:

CH_{3}OH + CO → HCO_{2}CH_{3}

In industry, this reaction is performed in the liquid phase at elevated pressure. Typical reaction conditions are 80 °C and 40 atm. The most widely used base is sodium methoxide. Hydrolysis of the methyl formate produces formic acid:

HCO_{2}CH_{3} + H_{2}O → HCOOH + CH_{3}OH

Hydrolysis and ammoniolysis of the methyl formate gives formic acid and formamide, respectively. Dimethylformamide, a commercial solvent, is industrially manufactured by carbonylation of dimethylamine.

(CH_{3})_{2}NH + CO → (CH_{3})_{2}NCHO

=== Phosgenation ===
A major industrial method for carbonylation entails the use of phosgene (COCl_{2}). Dialkyl carbonates are made in this way as indicated by the phosgenation of ethanol to give diethyl carbonate:

2 CH_{3}CH_{2}OH +COCl_{2} → (CH_{3}CH_{2}O)_{2}CO + 2 HCl

== Carbonylation in inorganic chemistry ==
Metal carbonyls, compounds with the formula M(CO)_{x}L_{y} (M = metal; L = other ligands) are prepared by carbonylation of transition metals. Iron and nickel powder react directly with CO to give Fe(CO)_{5} and Ni(CO)_{4}, respectively. Most other metals form carbonyls less directly, such as from their oxides or halides. Metal carbonyls are widely employed as catalysts in the hydroformylation and Reppe processes discussed above. Inorganic compounds that contain CO ligands can also undergo decarbonylation, often via a photochemical reaction.
