= Eubacterium =

Scientific classification
- Domain: Bacteria
- Kingdom: Bacillati
- Phylum: Bacillota
- Class: Clostridia
- Order: Eubacteriales
- Family: Eubacteriaceae
- Genus: Eubacterium; Prévot, 1938

Type species
- Eubacterium limosum (Eggerth 1935) Prévot 1938 (Approved Lists 1980)

Species
- E. aggregans; E. barkeri; E. callanderi; E. limosum; E. maltosivorans

Synonyms
- "Bacterium" ("Eubacterium") Janke 1930; "Butyribacterium" Barker & Haas 1944

Genus of bacteria

Eubacterium is a genus of anaerobic, Gram positive bacteria that forms part of the human gut microbiome. Members of this genus are phylogenetically diverse and contribute to gut health through metabolic activities such as fermentation and the production of beneficial compounds.

== Phylogeny ==
The currently accepted taxonomy is based on the List of Prokaryotic names with Standing in Nomenclature (LPSN) and National Center for Biotechnology Information (NCBI)

16S rRNA based LTP_10_2024

- - Pseudoramibacter
  - - Acetobacterium
    - - Eubacterium s.s.
        - - E. aggregans Mechichi et al. 2000
          - E. barkeri (Stadtman et al. 1972) Collins et al. 1994
        - - E. maltosivorans Feng et al. 2018
          - - E. callanderi Mountfort et al. 1988
            - E. limosum (Eggerth 1935) Prévot 1938

120 marker proteins based GTDB 09-RS220

- - - Pseudoramibacter
    - - Eubacterium species‑group 2
        - E. aggregans
        - E. barkeri
  - - Acetobacterium
    - - Eubacterium s.s.
        - E. maltosivorans
        - - E. callanderi
          - E. limosum

Species located elsewhere on the LTP and GTDB phylogenetic trees:	Orphaned species
"Ca. E. avistercoris" Gilroy et al. 2021; E. brachy Holdeman et al. 1980; E. cellulosolvens (Bryant et al. 1958) Holdeman & Moore 1972; E. coprostanoligenes Freier et al. 1994; "Ca. E. faecale" Gilroy et al. 2021; "Ca. E. faecavium" Gilroy et al. 2021; "Ca. E. faecigallinarum" Gilroy et al. 2021; "Ca. E. faecipullorum" Gilroy et al. 2021; E. hominis Liu et al. 2022; E. infirmum Cheeseman et al. 1996; E. multiforme (Distaso 1911) Holdeman & Moore 1970; E. nodatum Holdeman et al. 1980; E. oxidoreducens corrig. Krumholz & Bryant 1986; E. plexicaudatum Wilkins, Fulghum & Wilkins 1974; E. pyruvativorans Wallace et al. 2003; E. ramulus Moore, Johnson &Holdeman 1976; E. ruminantium Bryant 1959; E. saphenum corrig. Uematsu et al. 1993; "E. segne" Liu et al. 2021; E. siraeum Moore, Johnson & Holdeman 1976; E. sulci (Cato, Moore & Moore 1985) Jalava & Eerola 1999; E. tardum Cheeseman et al. 1996 [E. minutum Poco et al. 1996 non (Hauduroy et al. 1937) Prévot 1938]; E. tenue (Bergey et al. 1923) Holdeman & Moore 1970; E. uniforme van Gylswyk & van der Toorn 1985; E. ventriosum (Tissier 1908) Prévot 1938; E. xylanophilum van Gylswyk & van der Toorn 1985; E. yurii Margaret & Krywolap 1986	"E. acidiformans" Huang et al. 2024; "E. albensis" Wallace et al. 1998; E. album Liu et al. 2024; "E. difficile" Liu et al. 2021; "E. pectinii" Mountfort et al. 1993; "E. rangiferina" Sundset et al. 2008; "E. thermomarinus" Pledger et al. 1995

== See also ==
- List of bacterial orders
- List of bacteria genera
