= Eubacterium aggregans =

Scientific classification
- Domain: Bacteria
- Kingdom: Bacillati
- Phylum: Bacillota
- Class: Clostridia
- Order: Eubacteriales
- Family: Eubacteriaceae
- Genus: Eubacterium
- Species: E. aggregans

Binomial name
- Eubacterium aggregans Mechichi et al. 2000

Type strain
- DSM 12183, SR12

Species of bacterium

Eubacterium aggregans is a Gram-positive, homoacetogenic, non-spore-forming and anaerobic bacterium from the genus Eubacterium which has been isolated from olive mill wastewater in Tunisia
