= Enamidase =

Class of enzymes

enamidase

Identifiers
- EC no.: 3.5.2.18

Databases
- BRENDA: enzyme data
- ExPASy: NiceZyme view
- KEGG: enzyme entry
- MetaCyc: metabolic pathway
- Rhea: reactions
- PDB structures: RCSB PDB PDBe PDBsum
- Gene Ontology: AmiGO / QuickGO
Search
- PMC: articles
- PubMed: articles
- NCBI: proteins

Enamidase (EC 3.5.2.18) is an enzyme characterised from Eubacterium barkeri that catalyzes the hydrolysis of 1,4,5,6-tetrahydro-6-oxonicotinic acid to 2-formylglutaric acid and ammonia:

1,4,5,6-tetrahydro-6-oxonicotinic acid
2 H_{2}O
NH_{3}
2-formylglutaric acid

The reaction is part of a breakdown pathway for nicotinic acid, which is available in the environment and used by bacteria.

This enzyme is a hydrolase, one acting on carbon-nitrogen bonds other than peptide bonds, specifically in cyclic amides. The systematic name of this enzyme class is 6-oxo-1,4,5,6-tetrahydronicotinate amidohydrolase.
