= Eubacterium nodatum =

Scientific classification
- Domain: Bacteria
- Kingdom: Bacillati
- Phylum: Bacillota
- Class: Clostridia
- Order: Eubacteriales
- Family: Eubacteriaceae
- Genus: Eubacterium
- Species: E. nodatum

Binomial name
- Eubacterium nodatum Holdeman et al. 1980

Species of bacterium

Eubacterium nodatum is a Gram positive member of the oral flora of some patients with chronic periodontitis. It has been recently added to the red complex bacteria, that are most associated with disease.
