= Alkalibacter saccharofermentans =

Scientific classification
- Domain: Bacteria
- Kingdom: Bacillati
- Phylum: Bacillota
- Class: Clostridia
- Order: Eubacteriales
- Family: Eubacteriaceae
- Genus: Alkalibacter
- Species: A. saccharofermentans

Binomial name
- Alkalibacter saccharofermentans Garnova et al. 2005

Type strain
- DSM 14828, UNIQEM U-218, VKM B-2308, Z-79820

Synonyms
- Alkalibacterium saccharovorans

Species of bacterium

Alkalibacter saccharofermentans is a Gram-positive, obligately anaerobic, alkaliphilic and non-spore-forming bacterium from the genus Alkalibacter which has been isolated from a soda lake in the Transbaikal regio in Russia.
