= Acetobacterium carbinolicum =

Scientific classification
- Domain: Bacteria
- Kingdom: Bacillati
- Phylum: Bacillota
- Class: Clostridia
- Order: Eubacteriales
- Family: Eubacteriaceae
- Genus: Acetobacterium
- Species: A. carbinolicum

Binomial name
- Acetobacterium carbinolicum Eichler and Schink 1985 emend. Paarup et al. 2006

Type strain
- WoProp 1 = DSM 2925

Species of bacterium

Acetobacterium carbinolicum is a homoacetogenic, strictly anaerobic bacterium that oxidises primary aliphatic alcohols.

These Gram-positive, non-spore-forming and rod-shaped bacteria grow at optimal temperatures of about 30 °C, but some subspecies are also psychrotolerant, being able to grow at a minimum temperature of 2 °C, as the microorganisms belonging to the subspecies A. carbinolicum kysingense, which have been isolated from fine sand and mud sedimented in a brackish fjord in Jutland, Denmark, where concentrations of sodium chloride (NaCl) in water are up to 4.3%.
