= Favrile glass =

Shiny art glass used by Louis C. Tiffany

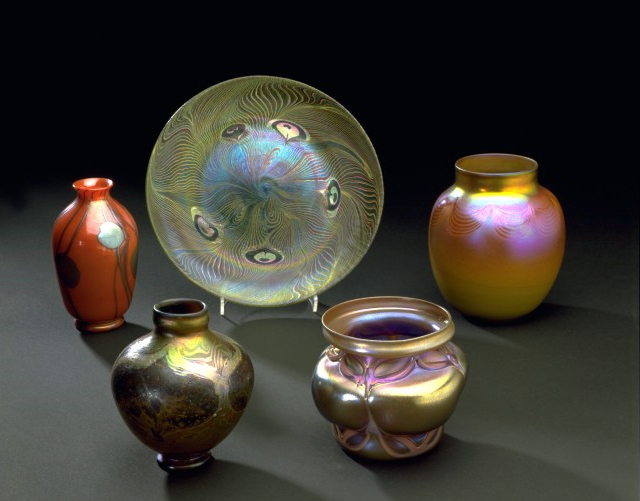
Favrile glass specimens from 1896 to 1902

Ancient Roman glass vase with iridescence caused by weathering

Favrile glass is a term originally used as a trade name for art glass produced at Tiffany Furnaces, a glassmaking factory owned by Louis Comfort Tiffany. The term is now used to describe the type of iridescent glass Tiffany produced there. First produced in the United States by Tiffany, this kind of lustred glass was invented by Arthur J. Nash, inspired by the iridescence of corroded glassware unearthed from Roman ruins. Tiffany lustred glass has a "soft, satiny sheen" due to Tiffany's use of opaque glass, in contrast to the "mirrorlike finish" achieved by some European varieties of lustred glass, which used transparent glass.

Tiffany used this glass, along with other types of Tiffany glass, in many Art Nouveau glass products designed and made by his studio, including stained glass windows and Tiffany lamps, glass mosaic murals, and blown glass vases and lamp shades. His largest and most significant work using Favrile glass is Dream Garden (1916), commissioned by the Curtis Publishing Company for their headquarters in Philadelphia and designed by Maxfield Parrish. It is now owned by the Pennsylvania Academy of the Fine Arts.

Favrile glass was highly reputed and very expensive in its time, and sparked many imitations.

== History ==
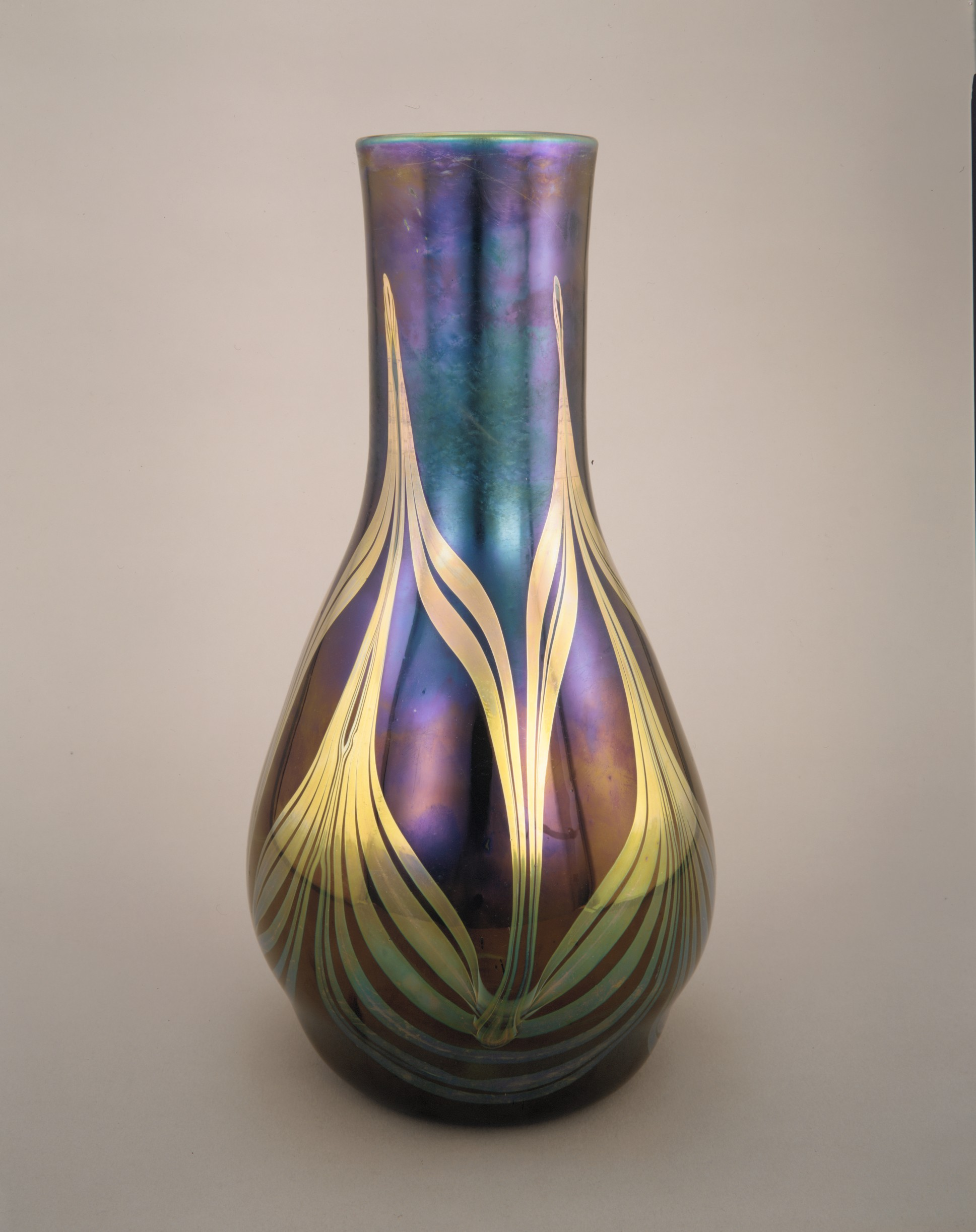
Favrile glass vase, circa 1893–96

Tiffany founded his first glassmaking firm in 1892, which he called the Tiffany Glass and Decorating Company. The factory, Tiffany Furnaces, was located in Corona, Queens, New York. It was managed by English immigrant Arthur J. Nash, who was skilled in glassmaking. It was here that Tiffany developed his unique method of glassmaking.

Tiffany developed this new glass with inspiration from ancient glass vessels, including Roman glass and Islamic glass, along with the contemporary work of Émile Gallé. In London he visited the South Kensington Museum, later renamed the Victoria and Albert Museum, whose extensive collection of Roman and Syrian glass made a deep impression on him. Some of the ancient glass items had iridescent surfaces due to corrosion from being buried in soil. He also admired the coloration of medieval glass and believed that he could improve on the quality of contemporary glass.

After much experimentation and development, he received the patent for Favrile glass in 1894. He made the first Favrile objects in 1896. At the 1900 Paris Exposition, Tiffany's Favrile glass won the grand prize in the exposition.

== Iridescence mechanism ==
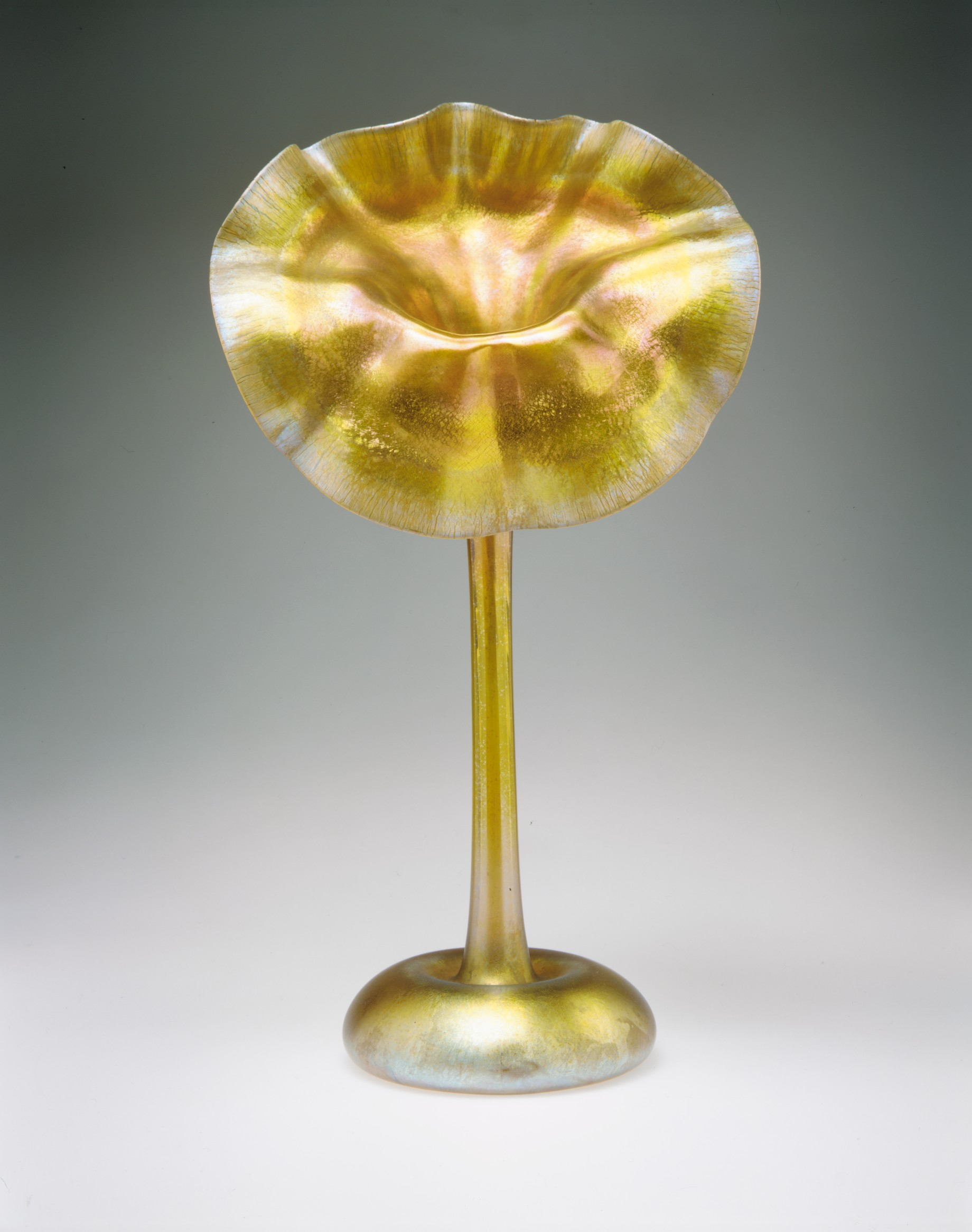
Jack-in-the-pulpit flower form favrile glass vase, circa 1900–1915

According to materials scientist Gregory Merkel, favrile glass achieves iridescence in a similar way to Aurene glass. The glass must have silver ions dissolved in it, which form a surface coat of metallic silver when the glass is placed in a chemically reducing environment. These silver ions are added through the addition of silver nitrate. The glass is then sprayed with dissolved tin salt, resulting in the formation of a thin and iridescent layer of tin oxide. The reducing environment was achieved by "turning up" the oil until the flame became green, at which point the glass would be plunged in and out of the flame until a "silver mirror" appeared on the surface, at which point it was sprayed with tin chloride to create the oxide layer. Thousands of experiments were required for Arthur Nash to develop this process. However, it is unknown who first discovered the general principle.

Chemically, the silver coat precipitates out of the glass because the reducing environment strips oxygen atoms from the surface of the glass, depositing electrons and negatively charging the surface of the glass. The positively charged silver ions inside then precipitate out, absorbing the electrons and neutralizing the charge.

== Description ==
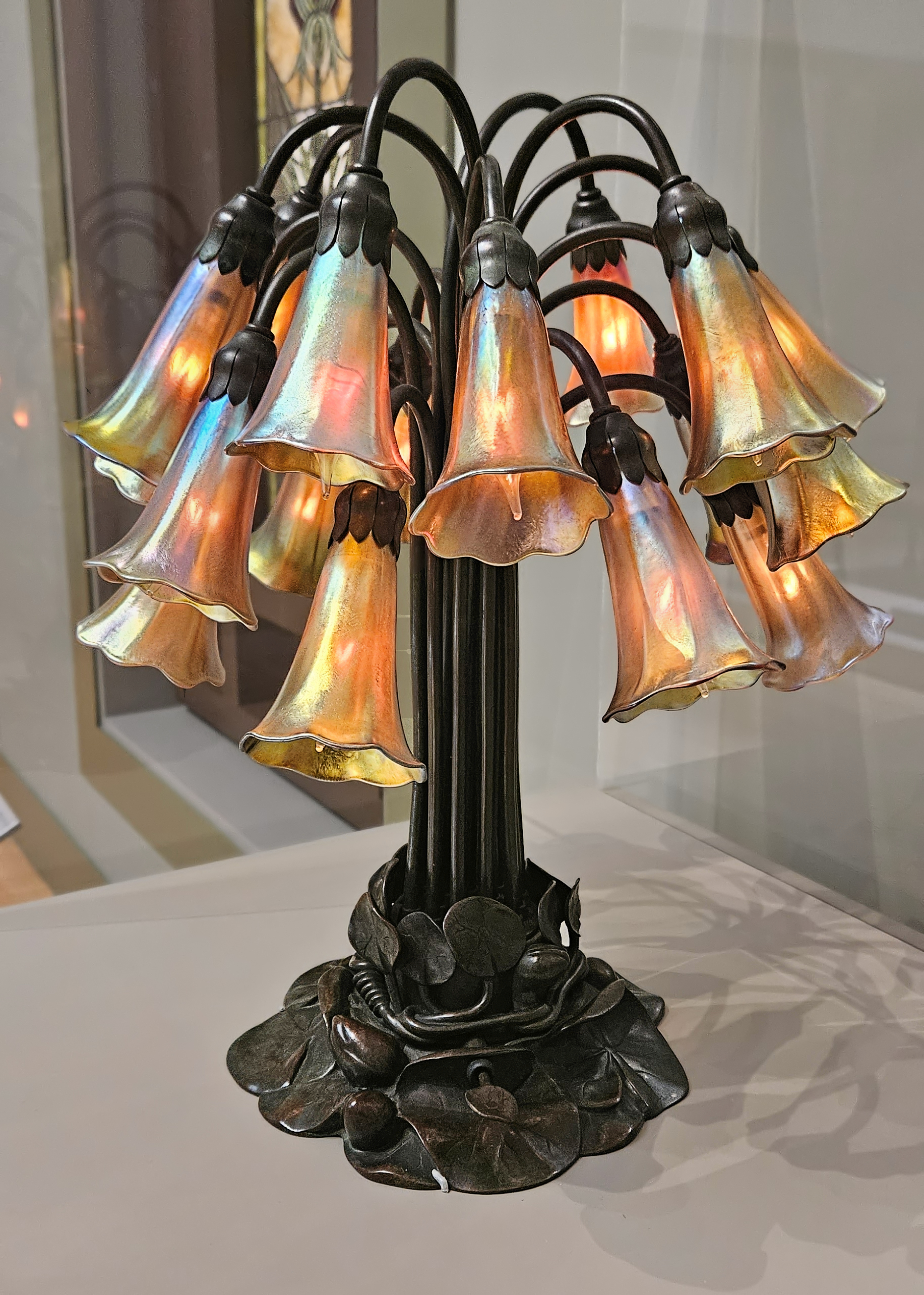
Lily lamp with favrile glass shades, circa 1905

Favrile is different from other iridescent glasses because its color is not just on the surface, but part of the glass. The original trade name, Fabrile, was derived from an Old English word, fabrile, meaning "hand-wrought" or handcrafted. Tiffany later changed the word to Favrile, "since this sounded better". Tiffany said "Favrile glass is distinguished by...brilliant or deeply toned colors, usually iridescent like the wings of certain American butterflies, the necks of pigeons and peacocks, the wing covers of various beetles."

Some of the distinguishing colors in Favrile glass include "Gold Lustre," "Samian Red," "Mazarin Blue," "Tel-el-amarna" (or Turquoise Blue), and "Aquamarine".

According to The Huntington, Favrile glass is handmade, and the glassblower mixes different kinds of glass together, before coating the final product in metallic oxides to achieve an iridescent, or color-changing sheen. As a result, favrile glass changes color in different lighting. In the Favrile process, the use of glass of varying color or density also results in "veins" of color. The Corning Museum of Glass describes the production process of one "Pansy" vase in detail. For this vase, tin chloride was sprayed on the hot glass, which was then reheated in a chemically reducing environment. According to Cooper Hewitt, favrile glassmaking includes "infusing" the glass with iridescent pigments, and layering colors to create a sense of volume.

According to the Charles Hosmer Museum of Modern Art, the glass made at Tiffany Studios was a kind of opalescent glass or American glass.

== Uses ==
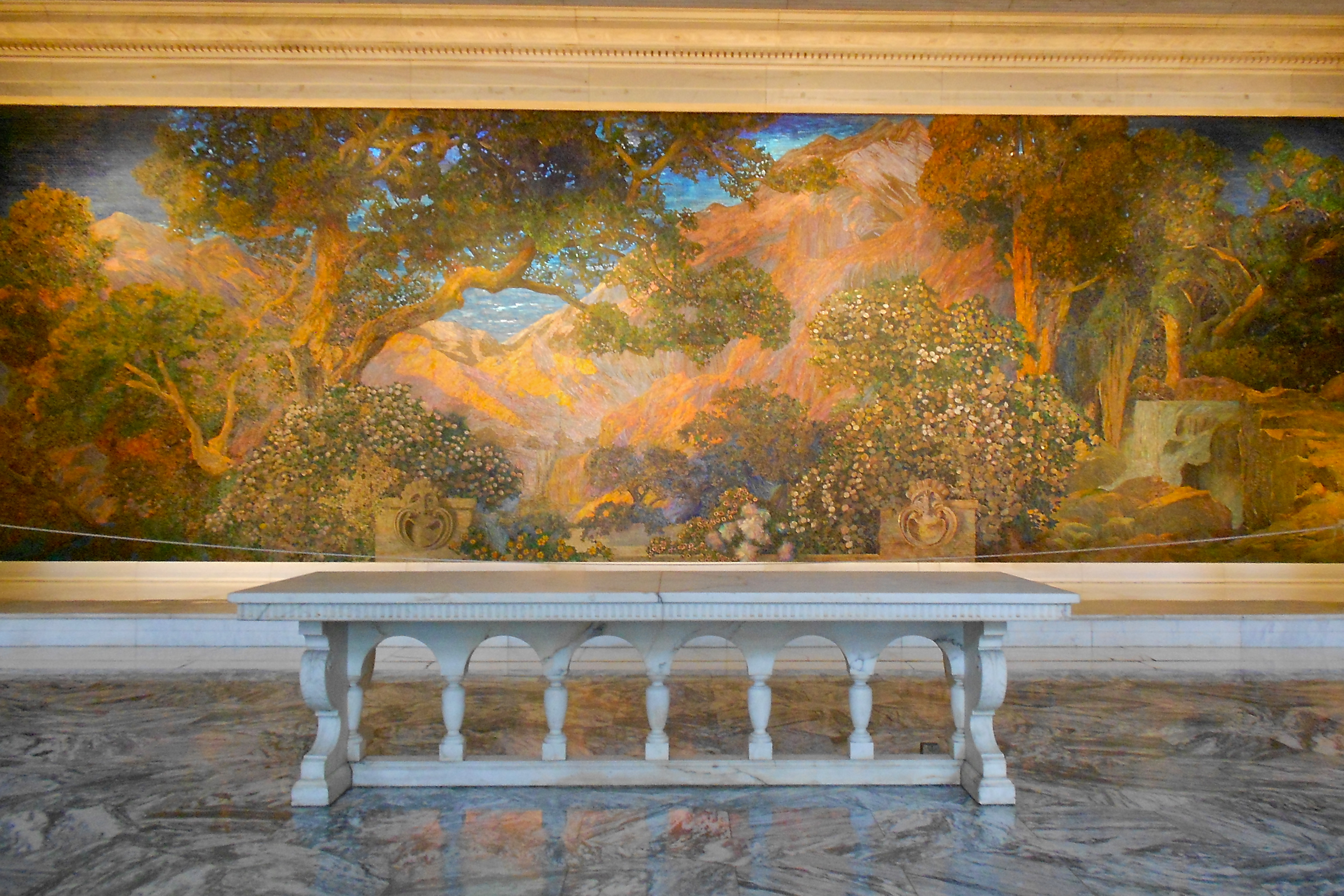
Dream Garden glass mosaic mural designed by Maxfield Parrish and made by Louis Comfort Tiffany

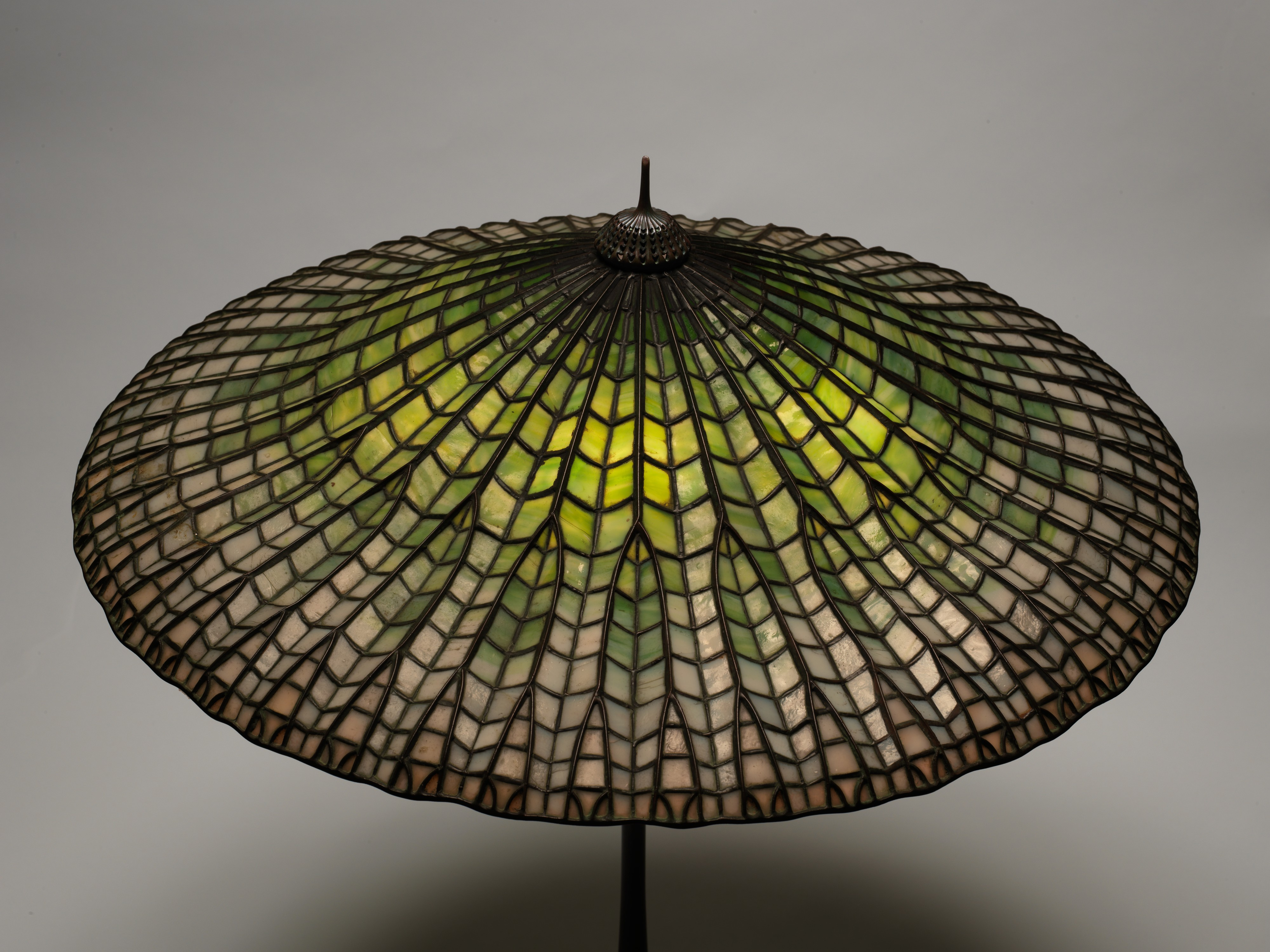
"Lotus, Pagoda" Tiffany lamp shade made with Favrile glass, circa 1900–15

Tiffany and collaborators developed the favrile glass technique for stained glass windows and glass mosaics, then used it for many other products, including a variety of blown glass vases. The vases include slender and colorful "flower form" bud vases along with more traditional forms.

The largest and most significant glass-mosaic produced with Favrile glass is likely the Dream Garden (1916), commissioned for the Curtis Publishing Company's headquarters in Philadelphia. Artist Maxfield Parrish designed the work, and Tiffany Studios executed and installed it. The work is now owned by the Pennsylvania Academy of the Fine Arts. Favrile glass also backs a large ornamental clock in Detroit's Guardian Building.

== Gallery ==
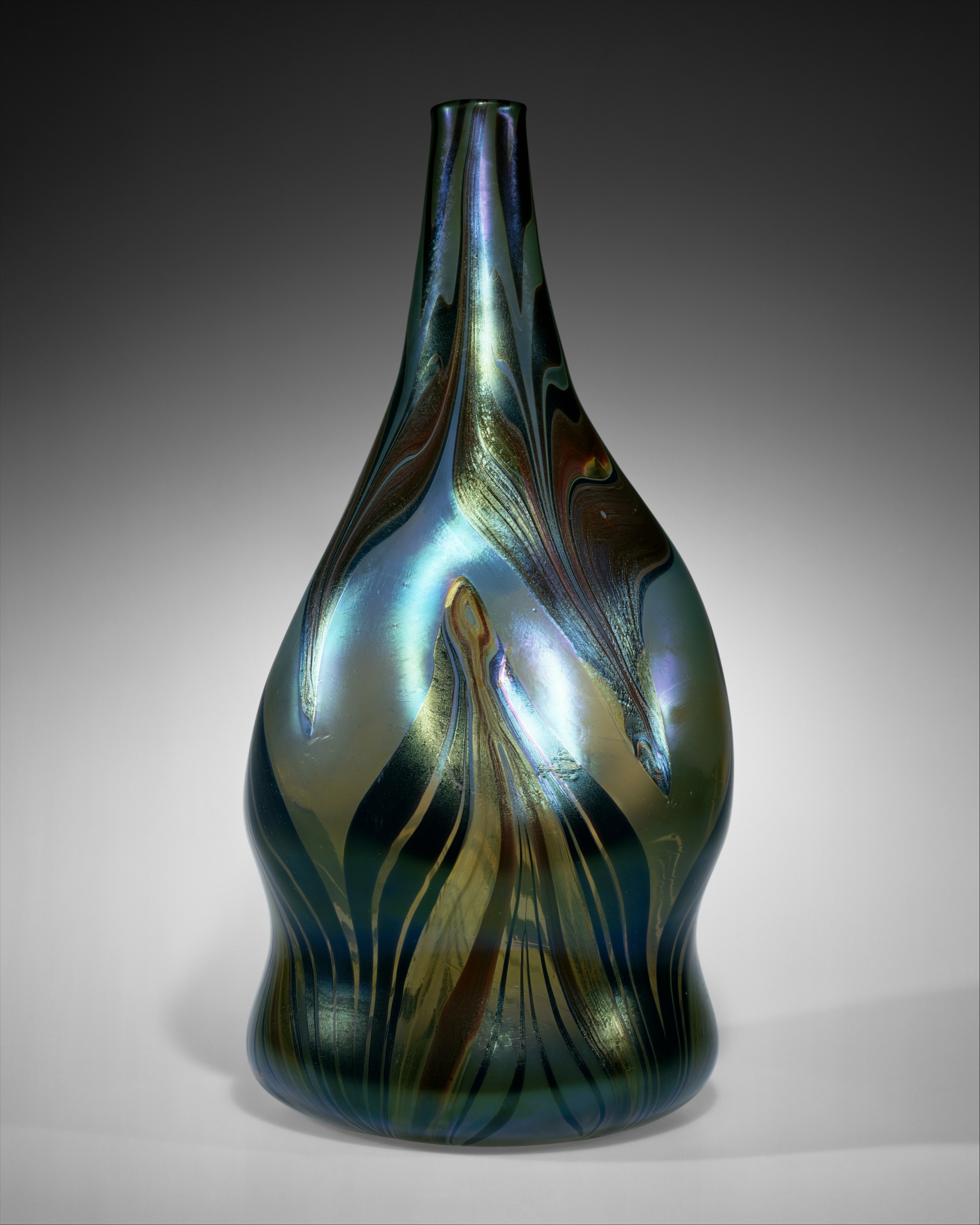
Circa 1893–94

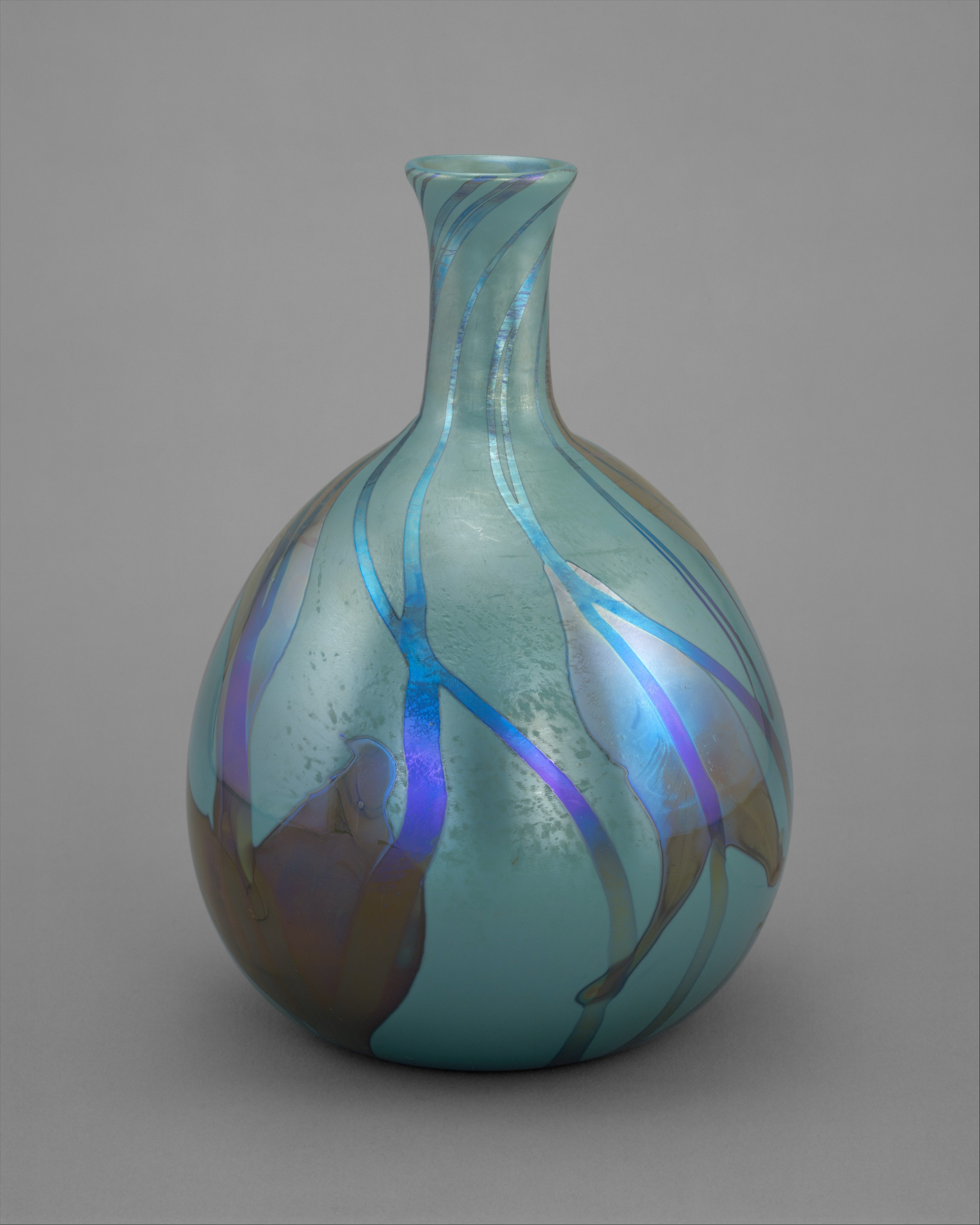
Circa 1893–96

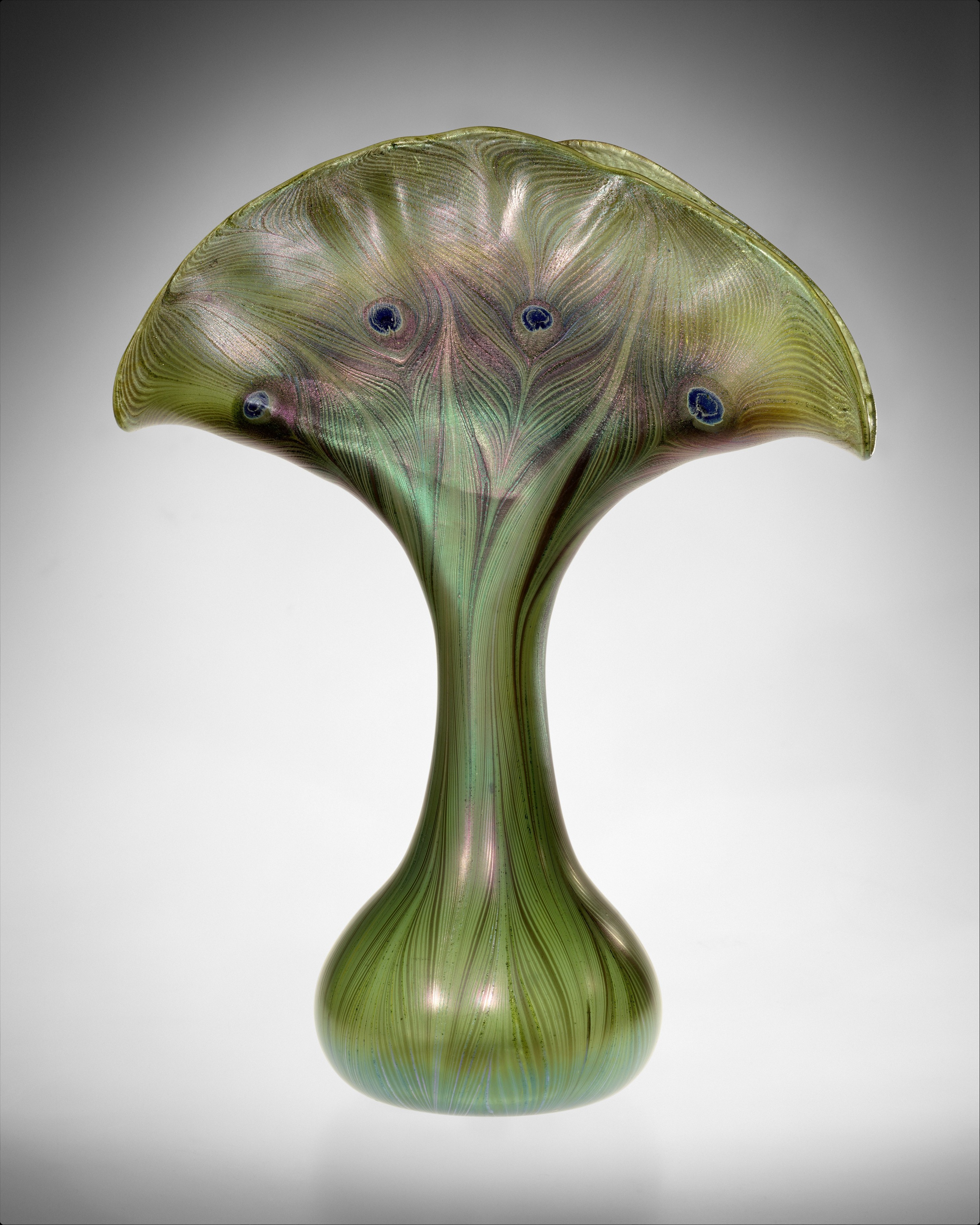
Circa 1893–96

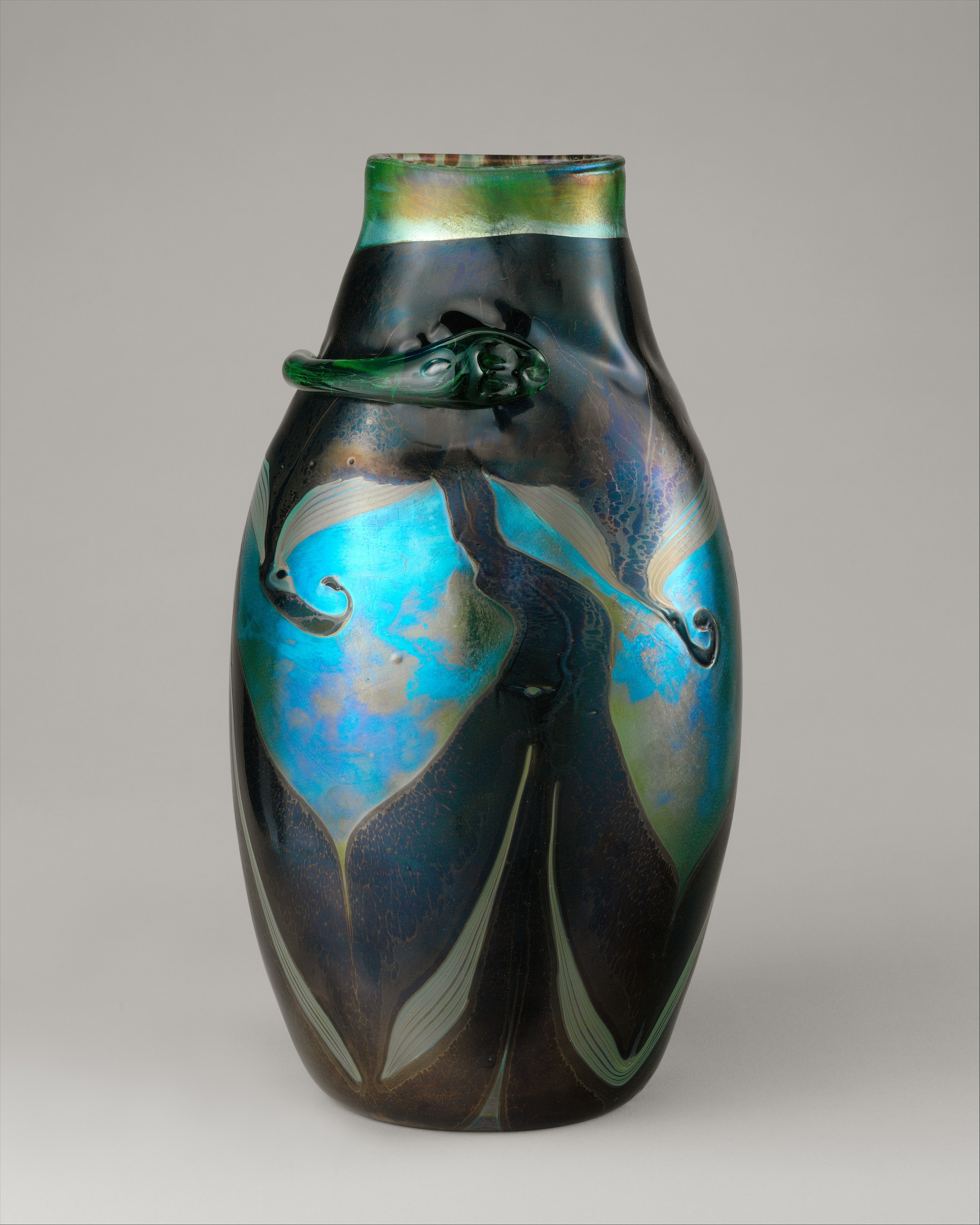
Circa 1897

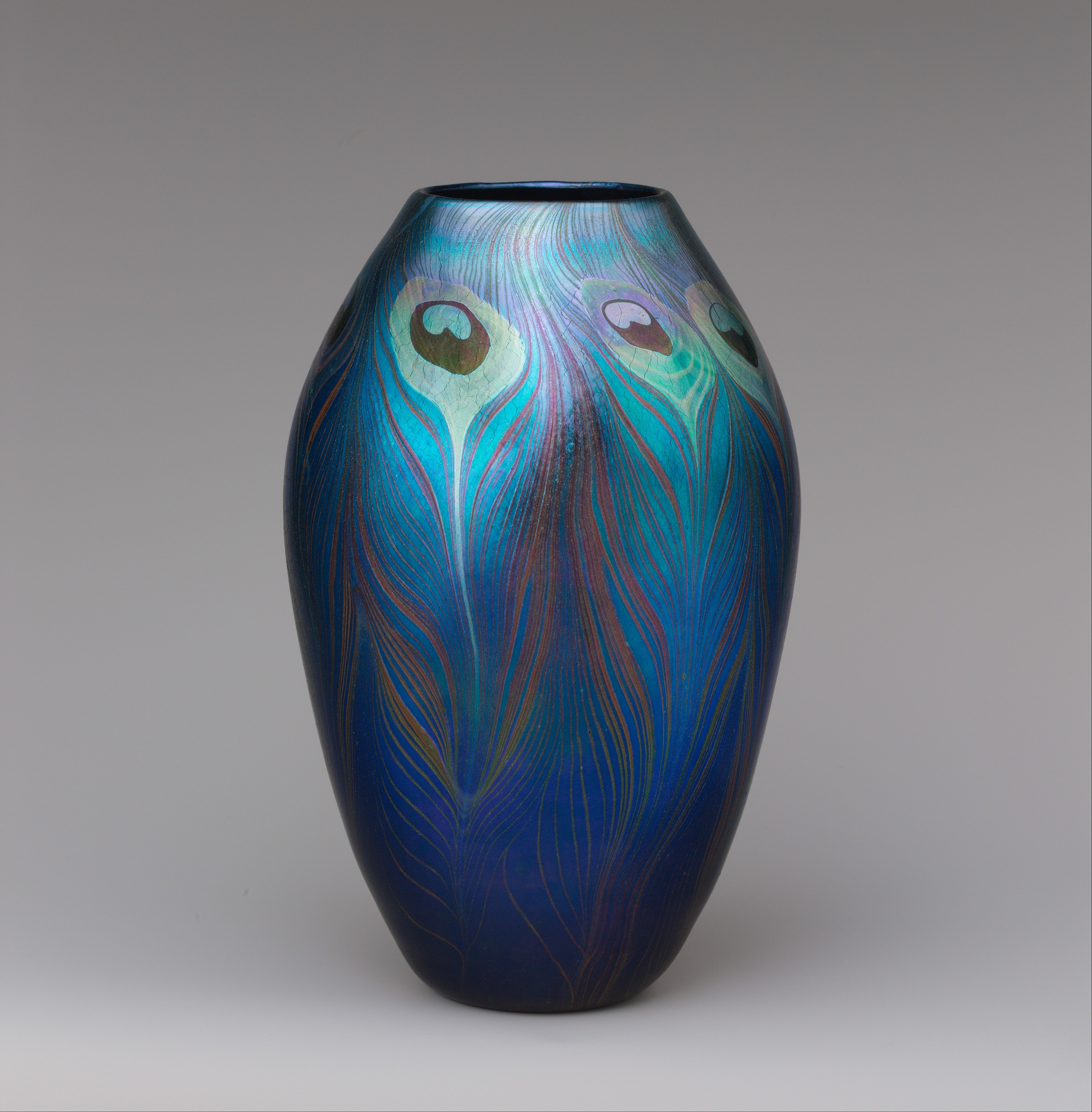
Circa 1900

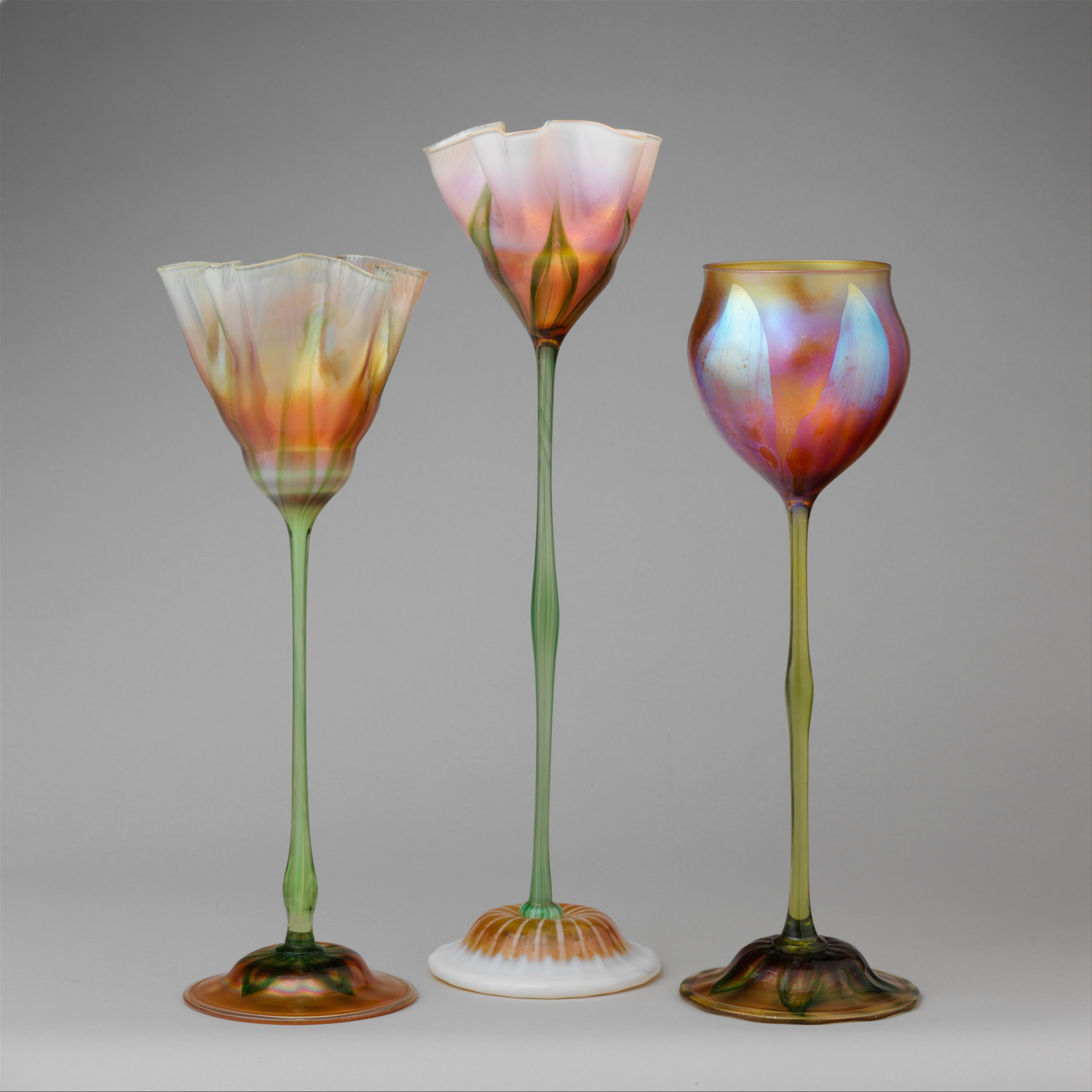
Circa 1900–1902

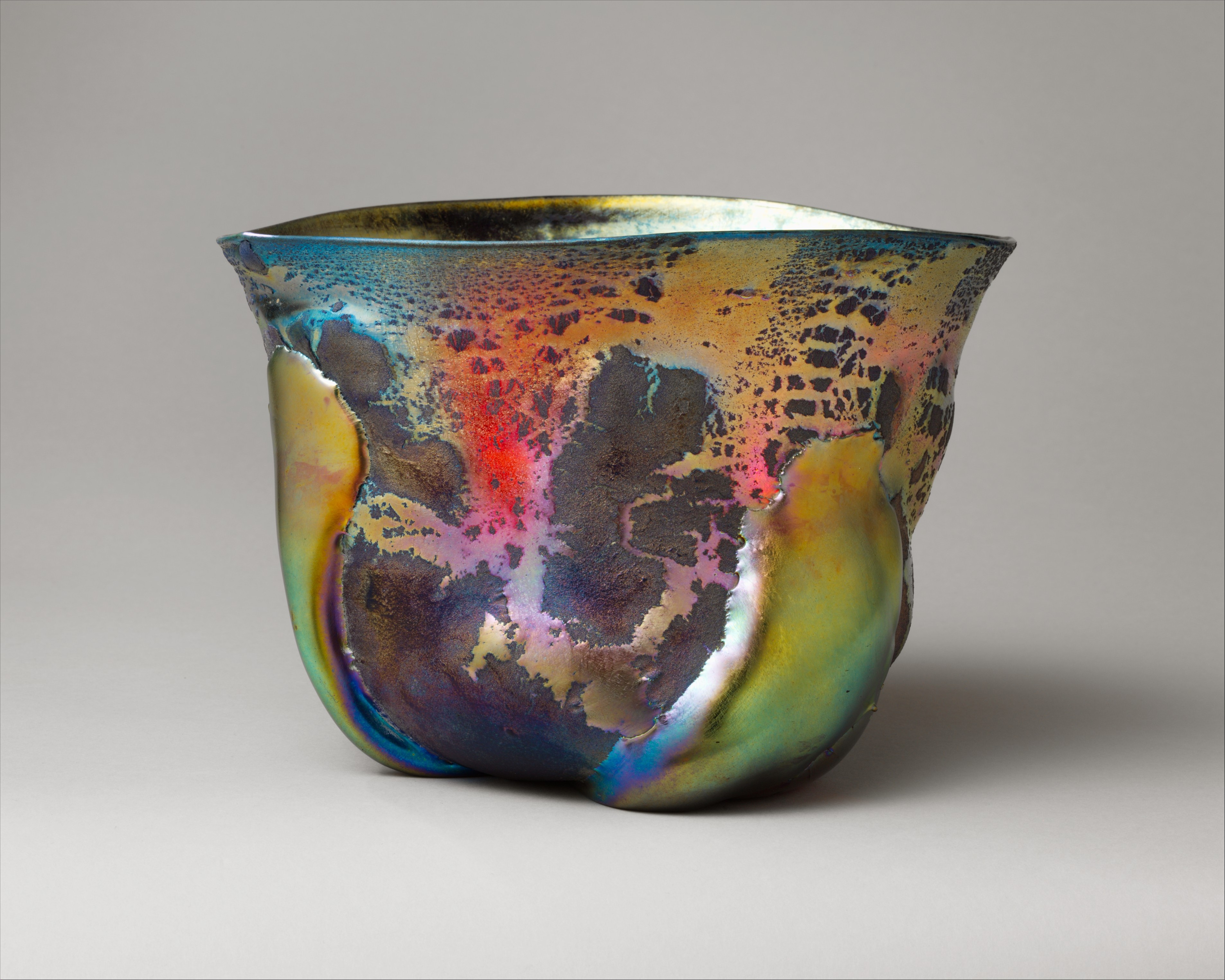
Circa 1908

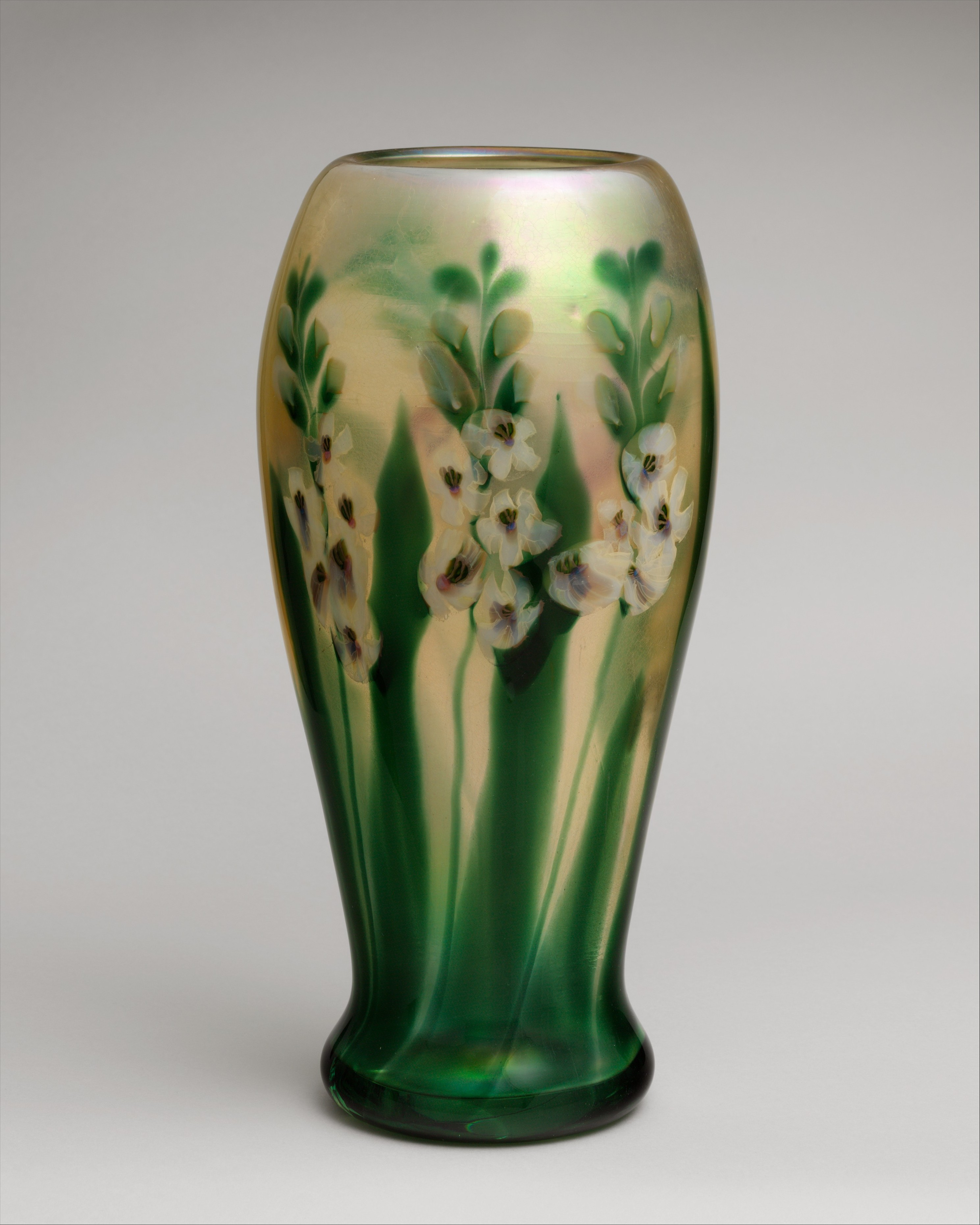
Circa 1909

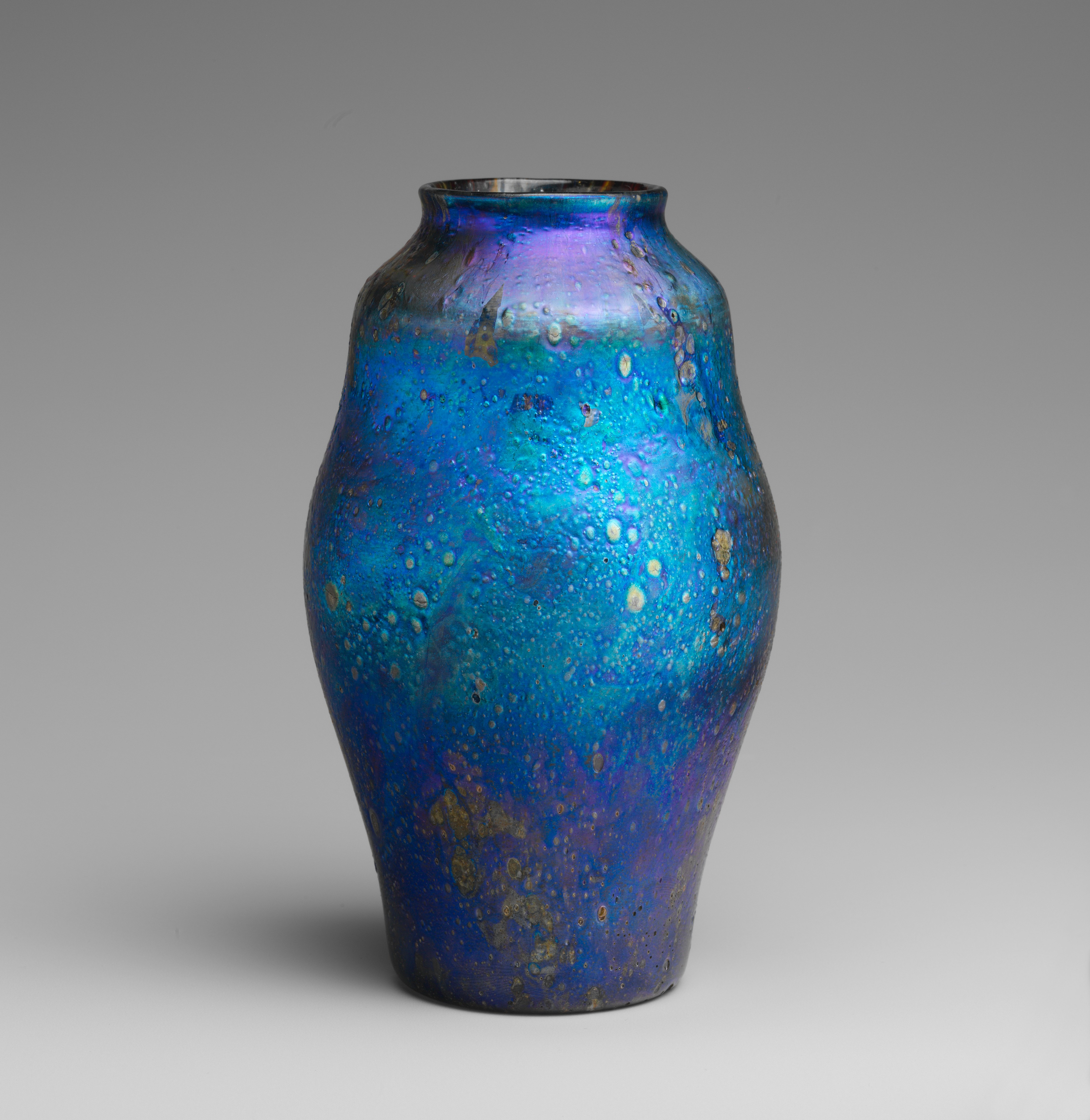
Circa 1912

== General and cited references ==
- Burlingham, Michael John (2002), Behind Glass: A Biography of Dorothy Tiffany Burlingham, Other Press, p. 364, ISBN 1-59051-010-0
- Craven, Wayne (2003), American Art: History and Culture, McGraw-Hill Professional, p. 687, ISBN 0-07-141524-6
- Hesse, Rayner W. (2007), Jewelrymaking Through History: An Encyclopedia, Greenwood Publishing Group, p. 220, ISBN 978-0-313-33507-5
- Lehmann, Helen Mary (1918), The Glassware Department, Ronald Press, p. 161
- Pevsner, Nikolaus (2005), Pioneers of Modern Design: From William Morris to Walter Gropius (4th ed.), Yale University Press, p. 192, ISBN 0-300-10571-1
- Tutag, Nola Huse; Hamilton, Lucy (1987), Discovering Stained Glass in Detroit, Wayne State University Press, p. 166, ISBN 0-8143-1875-4
- Von Drachenfels, Suzanne (2000), The Art of the Table: a Complete Guide to Table Setting, Table Manners, and Tableware, Simon & Schuster, pp. 592, ISBN 0-684-84732-9
- Warmus, William (2001), Louis Comfort Tiffany, New York: Wonderland Press; H.N. Abrams, ISBN 978-0-8109-5828-9
