= Acetic acid (data page) =

Chemical data page

This page provides supplementary chemical data on acetic acid.

== Material Safety Data Sheet ==
The handling of this chemical may incur notable safety precautions. It is highly recommend that you seek the Material Safety Datasheet (MSDS) for this chemical from a reliable source and follow its directions.

- PTCL Safety web site
- Science Stuff

== Structure and properties ==
Structure and properties
Dielectric constant, ε_{r}
6.15 ε_{0} at 20 °C
Surface tension
26.6 dyn/cm at 30 °C
Viscosity

1.222 mPa·s	at 20 °C
1.0396 mPa·s	at 30 °C
0.7956 mPa·s	at 50 °C
0.4244 mPa·s	at 110 °C

== Thermodynamic properties ==
Phase behavior
Triple point	289.8 K (16.7 °C), ? Pa
Eutectic point with water	–26.7 °C
Std entropy change of fusionΔ_{fus}S^{~~o~~}	40.5 J/(mol·K)
Liquid properties
Standard molar entropy S^{~~o~~}_{liquid}	158.0 J/(mol K)
Gas properties
Std enthalpy change of formation Δ_{f}H^{~~o~~}_{gas}	–438.1 kJ/mol
Standard molar entropy S^{~~o~~}_{gas}	282.84 J/(mol K)
Heat capacity c_{p}	63.4 J/(mol K)
van der Waals' constants	a = 1782.3 L^{2} kPa/mol^{2} b = 0.1068 liter per mole

== Vapor pressure of liquid ==
P in mm Hg	1	10	40	100	400	760	1520	3800	7600	15200	30400	45600
T in °C	–17.2	17.5	43.0	63.0	99.0	118.1	143.5	180.3	214.0	252.0	297.0	—

Table data obtained from CRC Handbook of Chemistry and Physics 44th ed.

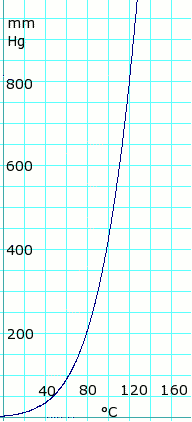
Acetic acid vapor pressure vs. temperature. Uses formula: $\scriptstyle P_{mmHg}=10^{7.80307 - \frac {1651.2} {225+T}}$ for T = 0 to 36 °C $\scriptstyle P_{mmHg}=10^{7.18807 - \frac {1416.7} {211+T}}$ for T = 36 to 170 °C Formula from Lange's Handbook of Chemistry, 10th ed.

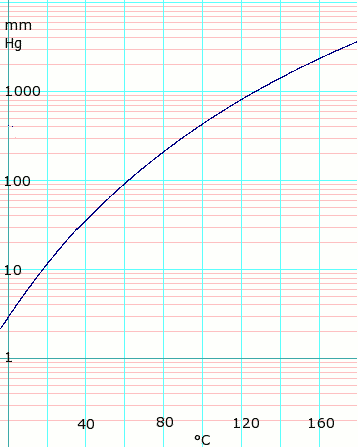
log_{10} of acetic acid vapor pressure vs. temperature. Uses formula: $\scriptstyle \log_{10}P_{mmHg}=7.80307 - \frac {1651.2} {225+T}$ for T = 0 to 36 °C $\scriptstyle \log_{10}P_{mmHg}=7.18807 - \frac {1416.7} {211+T}$ for T = 36 to 170 °C Formula from Lange's Handbook of Chemistry, 10th ed.

== Distillation data ==
Vapor-liquid Equilibrium for Acetic acid/Water; P = 760 mm Hg
BP Temp. °C	mole % water
BP Temp. °C	liquid	vapor
116.5	2.2	5.8
114.6	5.4	12.3
113.4	8.6	16.8
113.5	9.9	18.3
113.1	10.1	18.8
110.6	18.9	29.8
107.8	30.3	43.3
106.1	41.3	54.5
104.4	52.2	64.9
103.1	62.4	73.5
102.3	69.6	79.2
101.6	77.8	85.1
100.8	87.6	91.4
100.5	92.3	94.4
100.4	94.5	96.0
100.1	98.5	98.9

== Spectral data ==
UV-Vis
λ_{max}
207 nm (gas phase)
IR
Major absorption bands

(liquid film)
Wave number	transmittance
2937 cm^{−1}	26%
2684 cm^{−1}	41%
2631 cm^{−1}	39%
2569 cm^{−1}	49%
1758 cm^{−1}	19%
1714 cm^{−1}	4%
1617 cm^{−1}	66%
1414 cm^{−1}	20%
1360 cm^{−1}	39%
1294 cm^{−1}	12%
1053 cm^{−1}	67%
1016 cm^{−1}	41%
937 cm^{−1}	35%
892 cm^{−1}	41%
629 cm^{−1}	31%
607 cm^{−1}	49%
481 cm^{−1}	36%
473 cm^{−1}	52%

NMR
Proton NMR
δ CDCl_{3} 2.10 (3H), 11.42 (1H)
Carbon-13 NMR
δ CDCl_{3} 20.8, 178.1
MS
Masses of
main fragments
60 (75%), 45 (90%),
43 (100%), 42 (13%), 15 (17%)
