= Garciella =

Scientific classification
- Domain: Bacteria
- Kingdom: Bacillati
- Phylum: Bacillota
- Class: Clostridia
- Order: Eubacteriales
- Family: Eubacteriaceae
- Genus: Garciella; Miranda-Tello et al. 2003

Type species
- Garciella nitratireducens Miranda-Tello et al. 2003

Species
- G. nitratireducens

Genus of bacteria

Garciella is a Gram-positive, halotolerant, obligately anaerobic and moderately thermophilic bacterial genus from the family of Eubacteriaceae with one known species (Garciella nitratireducens).

== See also ==
- List of bacterial orders
- List of bacteria genera
