= Alkalibacter =

Scientific classification
- Domain: Bacteria
- Kingdom: Bacillati
- Phylum: Bacillota
- Class: Clostridia
- Order: Eubacteriales
- Family: Eubacteriaceae
- Genus: Alkalibacter; Garnova et al. 2005

Type species
- Alkalibacter saccharofermentans Garnova et al. 2005

Species
- Alkalibacter mobilis; Alkalibacter rhizosphaerae; Alkalibacter saccharofermentans

Genus of bacteria

Alkalibacter is a Gram-positive, rod-shaped, strictly anaerobic and non-motile bacterial genus from the family Eubacteriaceae.

== Phylogeny ==
The currently accepted taxonomy is based on the List of Prokaryotic names with Standing in Nomenclature (LPSN) and National Center for Biotechnology Information (NCBI)

16S rRNA based LTP_10_2024

- Alkalibacter
  - A. saccharofermentans Garnova et al. 2005
  - - A. mobilis Khomyakova et al. 2021
    - A. rhizosphaerae Namirimu et al. 2022

120 marker proteins based GTDB 09-RS220

- Alkalibacter
  - A. saccharofermentans
  - - A. mobilis
    - A. rhizosphaerae
