= Eubacterium barkeri =

Scientific classification
- Domain: Bacteria
- Kingdom: Bacillati
- Phylum: Bacillota
- Class: Clostridia
- Order: Eubacteriales
- Family: Eubacteriaceae
- Genus: Eubacterium
- Species: E. barkeri

Binomial name
- Eubacterium barkeri (Stadtman et al. 1972) Collins et al. 1994

Synonyms
- Clostridium barkeri

Species of bacterium

Eubacterium barkeri, previously known as Clostridium barkeri, is a bacterium belonging to the Bacillota.
