= Anaerofustis =

Scientific classification
- Domain: Bacteria
- Kingdom: Bacillati
- Phylum: Bacillota
- Class: Clostridia
- Order: Eubacteriales
- Family: Eubacteriaceae
- Genus: Anaerofustis; Finegold et al. 2004

Type species
- Anaerofustis stercorihominis Finegold et al. 2004

Species
- Anaerofustis butyriciformans; Anaerofustis stercorihominis

Genus of bacteria

Anaerofustis is a Gram-positive, strictly anaerobic, rod-shaped and non-spore-forming bacterial genus from the family Eubacteriaceae. Anaerofustis stercorihominis was isolated from human feces.
