= Sterling Chemicals =

Texas-based chemical producer

Sterling Chemicals is a chemicals producer, located in Houston, Texas. Product include acetic acid (16% of the North American market) and plasticizers.

In 2011 it was acquired by Eastman Chemical Company.
