= Alkalibaculum =

Scientific classification
- Domain: Bacteria
- Kingdom: Bacillati
- Phylum: Bacillota
- Class: Clostridia
- Order: Eubacteriales
- Family: Eubacteriaceae
- Genus: Alkalibaculum; Allen et al. 2010

Type species
- Alkalibaculum bacchi Allen et al. 2010

Species
- Alkalibaculum bacchi; Alkalibaculum sporogenes

Genus of bacteria

Alkalibaculum is a genus of bacteria in the phylum Bacillota.

== Etymology ==
The name Alkalibaculum derives from:
Arabic noun al-qaliy, the ashes of saltwort; Neo-Latin noun alkali, alkali; Latin neuter gender noun baculum, stick; Neo-Latin neuter gender noun Alkalibaculum, alkali stick.

== Species ==
The genus contains a single species, namely A. bacchi ( Allen et al. 2010, (Type species of the genus).; Latin genitive case noun bacchi, of Bacchus, Roman god of wine, referring to the production of ethanol by this organism.)
