= Tin chloride =

Tin chloride can refer to:

- Tin(II) chloride or stannous chloride (SnCl_{2})
- Tin(IV) chloride or stannic chloride or tin tetrachloride (SnCl_{4})

== See also ==
- Dibutylchloromethyltin chloride
- Tributyltin chloride
