= Pseudoramibacter =

Scientific classification
- Domain: Bacteria
- Kingdom: Bacillati
- Phylum: Bacillota
- Class: Clostridia
- Order: Eubacteriales
- Family: Eubacteriaceae
- Genus: Pseudoramibacter; Willems and Collins 1996

Type species
- Pseudoramibacter alactolyticus (Prévot & Taffanel 1942) Willems & Collins 1996

Species
- P. alactolyticus; "Ca. P. fermentans"; "P. porci"

Genus of bacteria

Pseudoramibacter is a Gram-positive, strictly anaerobic, non-spore-forming and non-motile bacterial genus from the family of Eubacteriaceae with one known species (Pseudoramibacter alactolyticus). Pseudoramibacter bacteria occur in birds. Pseudoramibacter alactolyticus is associated with endodontic infections.

== Phylogeny ==
The currently accepted taxonomy is based on the List of Prokaryotic names with Standing in Nomenclature (LPSN) and National Center for Biotechnology Information (NCBI)

16S rRNA based LTP_10_2024

- Pseudoramibacter
  - P. alactolyticus
  - "P. porci"

120 marker proteins based GTDB 09-RS220

- Pseudoramibacter
  - P. alactolyticus (Prévot & Taffanel 1942) Willems & Collins 1996
  - - "Ca. P. fermentans" Scarborough et al. 2020
    - "P. porci" Wylensek et al. 2020

== See also ==
- List of bacterial orders
- List of bacteria genera
