= Dibutylchloromethyltin chloride =

Names
- IUPAC name Dibutyl(chloro)(chloromethyl)stannane
- Other names DBCT

Identifiers
CAS Number	61553-17-1
3D model (JSmol)	Interactive image
ChemSpider	164378
PubChem CID	189186
UNII	N2J5VG8RQD
CompTox Dashboard (EPA)	DTXSID00210541
- InChI: InChI=1S/2C4H9.CH2Cl.ClH.Sn/c2*1-3-4-2;1-2;;/h2*1,3-4H2,2H3;1H2;1H;/q;;;;+1/p-1 Key: XWFCEWFXSQFZPI-UHFFFAOYSA-M
- SMILES: CCCC[Sn](CCCC)(CCl)Cl

Properties
Chemical formula	C_{9}H_{20}Cl_{2}Sn
Molar mass	317.87 g·mol^{−1}

Hazards
- Occupational safety and health (OHS/OSH)
Main hazards	Toxic, vesicant
- Except where otherwise noted, data are given for materials in their standard state (at 25 °C [77 °F], 100 kPa). Infobox references

Dibutylchloromethyltin chloride (DBCT) is a toxic organotin compound. It is a potent and irreversible ATP synthase inhibitor. DBCT is a volatile liquid with powerful vesicant effects.

== See also ==
- Tributyltin chloride
- Oligomycin
