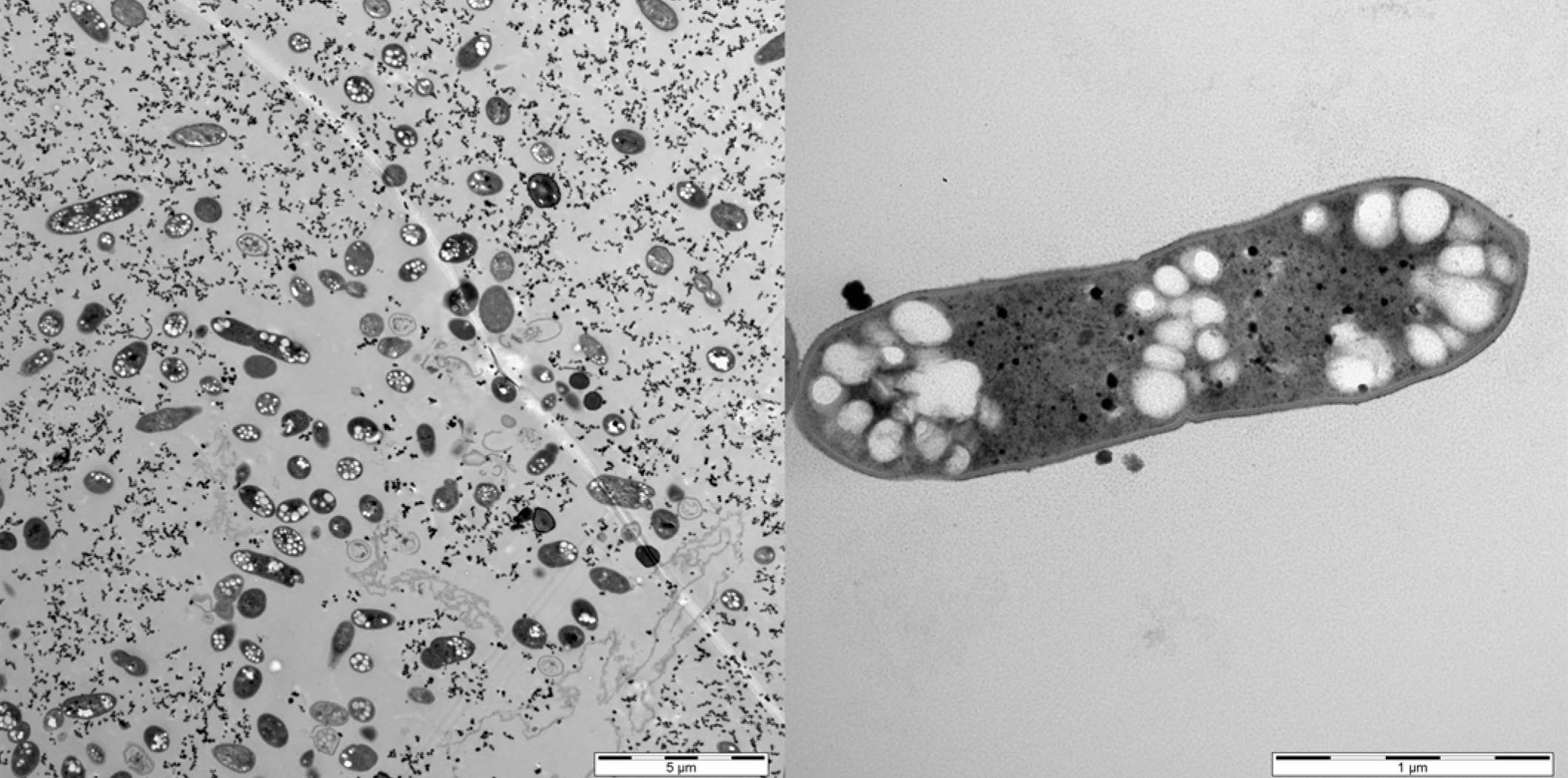
- Acetobacterium woodii on the right and is getting fermentated as shown on the left

Scientific classification
- Domain: Bacteria
- Kingdom: Bacillati
- Phylum: Bacillota
- Class: Clostridia
- Order: Eubacteriales
- Family: Eubacteriaceae
- Genus: Acetobacterium; Balch et al.

Type species
- Acetobacterium woodii Balch et al. 1977

Species
- A. bakii; A. carbinolicum; "A. dehalogenans"; A. fimetarium; A. malicum; A. paludosum; "A. psammolithicum"; "A. submarinus"; A. tundrae; A. wieringae; A. woodii

= Acetobacterium =

Genus of bacteria

Acetobacterium is a genus of anaerobic, Gram-positive bacteria that belong to the Eubacteriaceae family. The type species of this genus is Acetobacterium woodii. The name, Acetobacterium, has originated because they are acetogens, predominantly making acetic acid as a byproduct of anaerobic metabolism. Most of the species reported in this genus are homoacetogens, i.e. solely producing acetic acid as their metabolic byproduct. They should not be confused with acetic acid bacteria which are aerobic, Gram-negative Alphaproteobacteria.

Other acetogens use the Wood–Ljungdahl pathway to reduce CO or CO_{2} and produce acetate, but what distinguishes A.woodii and other Acetobacterium from other acetogens is that it conserves energy by using an Rnf complex to create a sodium gradient rather than a proton gradient. This means that A.woodii would need sodium in its environment in order to make ATP.

When reducing CO_{2} to acetate the Acetobacterium uses the Wood–Ljungdahl pathway with CO_{2} as the electron acceptor. However, the Acetobacterium can use other electron acceptors like caffeate. To use caffeate as an electron acceptor the bacterium couples hydrogen dependent caffeate reduction with electrons from hydrogen and uses sodium ions as coupling ions. The step in the electron transport chain that creates the sodium gradient is the ferredoxin-dependent reduction of NAD^{+}.

One application of Acetobacterium, is that A. woodii could be used in the transformation of tetrachloromethane to dichloromethane and carbon dioxide by reductive dechlorinations, but the reactions taken to get to the final product are unknown. This reaction is useful because the products, CO_{2} and dichloromethane are less toxic than tetrachloromethane. Another application of A.woodii is that it can reduce the effects of greenhouse gases since A.woodii can be used to convert CO_{2} and CO into acetyl-CoA which could then be used to make other chemicals like ethanol and acetate. The production of ethanol by Acetobacterium using chemolithotrophic methods is important because ethanol can be used as a biofuel. By using the ethanol that is produced by the bacterium researchers aim to create a sustainable way to create energy.

== Phylogeny ==
The currently accepted taxonomy is based on the List of Prokaryotic names with Standing in Nomenclature (LPSN) and National Center for Biotechnology Information (NCBI)

16S rRNA based LTP_10_2024

- Acetobacterium
  - - A. bakii Kotsyurbenko et al. 1997
    - - A. paludosum Kotsyurbenko et al. 1997
      - A. tundrae Simankova et al. 2001
  - - A. carbinolicum Eichler & Schink 1985
    - - - A. woodii Balch et al. 1977
        - A. wieringae Braun & Gottschalk 1983
      - - A. fimetarium Kotsyurbenko et al. 1997
        - A. malicum Tanaka & Pfennig 1990

120 marker proteins based GTDB 09-RS220

- Acetobacterium
  - A. bakii
  - - - A. woodii
      - - "A. dehalogenans" Kaufmann, Wohlfarth &
          Diekert 1998 [Acetobacterium malicum]
        - A. wieringae
    - - A. fimetarium
      - - A. paludosum
        - A. tundrae

== See also ==
- List of bacterial orders
- List of bacteria genera
