= Eubacteriaceae =

Scientific classification
- Domain: Bacteria
- Kingdom: Bacillati
- Phylum: Bacillota
- Class: Clostridia
- Order: Eubacteriales
- Family: Eubacteriaceae; Ludwig et al. 2010

Genera
- Acetobacterium; Alkalibacter; Alkalibaculum; Anaerofustis; Eubacterium; Garciella; Irregularibacter; Pseudoramibacter; Rhabdanaerobium

Synonyms
- Eubacterieae Prévot 1961; "Eubacterinae" corrig. Trevisan 1879; "Butyribacteriaceae" Orla-Jensen 1909

Family of bacteria

The Eubacteriaceae are a family of Gram-positive bacteria in the order Clostridiales.

== Phylogeny ==
The currently accepted taxonomy based on the List of Prokaryotic names with Standing in Nomenclature (LPSN) and the National Center for Biotechnology Information (NCBI).

16S rRNA based LTP_10_2024

- - Garciellaceae
    - Irregularibacter Lagkouvardos et al. 2016
    - - Rhabdanaerobium Liu et al. 2017
      - Garciella Miranda-Tello et al. 2003
  - Eubacteriaceae
    - - Alkalibacter Garnova et al. 2005
      - Alkalibaculum Allen et al. 2010
    - - Anaerofustis Finegold et al. 2004
      - - Pseudoramibacter Willems & Collins 1996
        - - Eubacterium Janke 1930 ex Prévot 1938
          - Acetobacterium Balch et al. 1977 non Ludwig 1898

120 marker proteins based GTDB 09-RS220

- Eubacteriales s.s.
  - - Garciellaceae
      - Garciella
      - Irregularibacter
  - - - Anaerofustaceae
        Anaerofustis
    - - Alkalibacteraceae
        - Alkalibacter
        - Alkalibaculum
      - Eubacteriaceae s.s.
        - - Eubacterium species-group 2
          - Pseudoramibacter
        - - Acetobacterium
          - Eubacterium

== See also ==
- List of bacterial orders
- List of bacteria genera
