= 1883 in science =

The year 1883 in science and technology involved some significant events, listed below.

== Astronomy ==
- March 2 – The Hong Kong Observatory is established.
- May 6 – A total solar eclipse occurs and is observed at the Caroline Island by astronomers aboard the USS Hartford.

== Chemistry ==
- April 5 – Liquid oxygen is produced for the first time.
- Svante Arrhenius develops ion theory to explain conductivity in electrolytes.
- The Claus process is first patented by German chemist Carl Friedrich Claus.
- The Schotten–Baumann reaction is first described by chemists Carl Schotten and Eugen Baumann.

== Cryptography ==
- Auguste Kerckhoffs publishes "La Cryptographie Militaire".

== Earth sciences ==
- August 26 – Krakatoa begins its final phase of eruptions at 1:06 pm local time. These produce a number of tsunami, mainly in the early hours of the next day, which result in about 36,000 deaths on the islands of Sumatra and Java. The final explosion at 10:02 am on August 27 destroys the island of Krakatoa itself and is heard up to 3000 miles away.
- Vasily Dokuchaev publishes Russian Chernozem.

== Genetics ==
- The concept and term Eugenics are formulated by Francis Galton.

== Medicine ==
- German psychiatrist Karl Ludwig Kahlbaum identifies a disorder characterized by recurring mood cycles which he and his student Ewald Hecker name cyclothymia.
- Thomas Clouston publishes Clinical Lectures on Mental Diseases.
- Emil Kraepelin publishes Compendium der Psychiatrie.
- Journal of the American Medical Association first published under this title.

== Physics ==
- Osborne Reynolds popularizes use of the Reynolds number in fluid mechanics.

== Technology ==
- February 13 – Seth Wheeler is granted a United States patent for toilet paper in a perforated roll supported in the center with a tube.
- January 19 – The first electric lighting system employing overhead wires begins service in Roselle, New Jersey, United States, installed by Thomas Edison.
- May 24 – Brooklyn Bridge opens to traffic in New York. Designed by John A. Roebling with project management assisted by his wife Emily, its main suspension span of 1,595 feet 6 inches (486.31 m) exceeds the previous record by 330 feet (100 m), and will not be surpassed for twenty years.
- Charles Fritts constructs the first solar cell using the semiconductor selenium on a thin layer of gold to form a device giving less than 1% efficiency.

== Zoology ==
- August 12 – The last quagga dies at the Artis Magistra zoo in Amsterdam.

== Awards ==
- Copley Medal: William Thomson, Lord Kelvin
- Wollaston Medal for Geology: William Thomas Blanford

== Births ==
- January 4 – Johanna Westerdijk (died 1961), Dutch plant pathologist.
- February 10 – Edith Clarke (died 1959), American electrical engineer, inducted into the National Inventors Hall of Fame.
- March 4 – Julius Fromm (died 1945), German businessman, inventor known for the Condom machine
- May 5 – Anna Johnson Pell Wheeler (died 1966), American mathematician.
- May 13 – Georgios Papanikolaou (died 1962), Greek-born cytopathologist, inventor of the Pap smear.
- June 24 – Victor Francis Hess (died 1964), American physicist.
- July 15 – Orii Hyōjirō (died 1970), Japanese animal specimen collector.
- August 4 – Sydney Smith (died 1969), New Zealand-born forensic pathologist.
- August 6 – Constance Georgina Adams (died 1968), South African botanist.
- October 2 – Karl von Terzaghi (died 1963), Austrian "father of soil mechanics".
- October 8 – Otto Heinrich Warburg (died 1970), German physiologist, winner of the 1931 Nobel Prize in Physiology or Medicine.

== Deaths ==
- January 23 – George Miller Beard (born 1839), American neurologist.
- April 10 - Maurice Krishaber (born 1836), naturalised French Hungarian otorhinolaryngologist.
- April 14 – William Farr (born 1807), English epidemiologist.
- April 28 – Rev. John Russell (born 1795), English dog breeder.
- May 13 – James Young (born 1811), Scottish chemist.
- June 18 – John Waterston (born 1811), Scottish physicist and civil engineer (drowned).
- June 26 – General Sir Edward Sabine (born 1788), Anglo-Irish physicist, astronomer and explorer.
- September 15 – Joseph Plateau (born 1801), Belgian physicist.
- December 8 – François Lenormant (born 1837), French assyriologist and numismatist.
- December 13 – John Stringfellow (born 1799), English pioneer of heavier-than-air flight.
