= Dubowitz =

Dubowitz is a surname. Notable people with it include:

- Lilly Dubowitz (1930–2016), Hungarian-born British paediatrician
- Mark Dubowitz (born 1968), executive director of the Foundation for Defense of Democracies
- Victor Dubowitz (born 1931), English neurologist

== See also ==
- Dubowitz Score, a method for estimating the gestational age of babies
- Dubowitz syndrome, a rare genetic disorder
