= 1970 in science =

The year 1970 in science and technology involved some significant events, listed below.

== Astronomy and space exploration ==
- February 11 – The Ohsumi satellite is launched, making Japan the fourth country to launch a satellite into orbit.
- March 31 – The Explorer 1 satellite reenters the Earth's atmosphere after 12 years in orbit.
- April 11 – The Apollo 13 space mission is launched, but has to be aborted on April 13.
- April 17 – Apollo 13 returns safely to Earth.
- June 1 – Soyuz 9, a two-man spacecraft, is launched from the Soviet Union for an orbital flight of nearly 18 days, an endurance record at this time.
- August 31 – Solar eclipse of August 31, 1970: An annular solar eclipse is visible in Oceania, and is the 14th solar eclipse of Solar Saros 144.
- September 20 – Luna 16 lands on the Moon and lifts off the next day with samples, landing back on Earth September 24.
- October 20 – The Zond 8 lunar orbiter is launched by the Soviet Union.
- November 17 – Lunokhod 1, the first roving remote-controlled robot to land on another world, lands on Mare Imbrium on the Moon after being released by the orbiting Luna 17 spacecraft.
- December 15 – Venera 7 lands on Venus and becomes the first spacecraft to transmit data from another planet successfully (launched August 17).

== Biology ==
- August – Songs of the Humpback Whale, produced by Roger Payne, is released, publicly demonstrating whale vocalization for the first time and becoming influential in public support for whale conservation.
- The Parc naturel régional de Camargue is established in the south of France.

== Chemistry ==
- August – Ulrich K. Laemmli's refinement of the SDS-PAGE method is published.

== Computer science ==
- January 1 – Unix time begins at 00:00:00 UTC.
- June – The Datapoint 2200 is announced by the Computer Terminal Corporation (CTC).
- June–August – The programming language FLOW is devised by Jef Raskin.
- November 17 – The first United States patent for the computer mouse is issued to Douglas Engelbart.
- Bomber by Len Deighton, the first novel written on a word processor (the IBM MT/ST), is published in England.
- The first Pascal compiler is released by Niklaus Wirth.
- The Xerox PARC computer laboratory is opened in Palo Alto, California.

== Earth sciences ==
- January 4 – The Tonghai earthquake (7.1 M_{w}) occurs in Tonghai County, Yunnan province, China, killing an estimated 14,621 and injuring 26,783.
- May 24 – Drilling on the Kola Superdeep Borehole begins on the Kola Peninsula of Russia.

== Mathematics ==
- Conway's Game of Life is devised by John Horton Conway.
- Kurt Gödel's ontological proof of the existence of God is circulated.

== Medicine ==
- The Dubowitz Score for estimating the gestational age of babies is published by Lilly and Victor Dubowitz.
- The Exeter hip replacement stem is first implanted at the Princess Elizabeth Orthopaedic Hospital in Exeter, England.
- The first case of monkeypox in humans is identified in the Democratic Republic of the Congo.

== Physics ==
- The GIM mechanism is predicted by Sheldon Glashow, John Iliopoulos and Luciano Maiani.

== Psychology ==
- The minimal group paradigm is developed by Henri Tajfel.
- Studies in Animal and Human Behavior, Volume I is published by Konrad Lorenz.

== Technology ==
- June 2 – The Cleddau Bridge collapses during construction in Wales, killing four and leading to the introduction of new standards for box girder bridges in the United Kingdom.

== Events ==
- June 19 – The Patent Cooperation Treaty (PCT) is signed into international law, providing a unified procedure for filing patent applications.

== Awards ==
- Fields Prize in Mathematics – Alan Baker, Heisuke Hironaka, Sergei Novikov and John Griggs Thompson
- Nobel Prizes:
  - Physics – Hannes Alfvén, Louis Néel
  - Chemistry – Luis F. Leloir
  - Medicine – Bernard Katz, Ulf von Euler, Julius Axelrod
- Turing Award – James H. Wilkinson

== Births ==
- March 27 – Eleanor Maguire, Irish-born neuropsychologist.
- August 1 – Elon Lindenstrauss, Israeli mathematician.
- September 3 – Stanislav Smirnov, Russian-born mathematician.

== Deaths ==
- January 5 – Max Born (b. 1882), German physicist and recipient of the 1954 Nobel Prize in physics.
- January 14 – William Feller (b. 1906), Croatian-born American mathematician.
- January 27 – Marietta Blau (b. 1894), Austrian physicist.
- February 16 – Francis Peyton Rous (b. 1879), American pathologist, recipient of the Nobel Prize in Physiology or Medicine
- April 27 – Orii Hyōjirō (b. 1883), Japanese animal specimen collector.
- May 1 – Ralph Hartley (b. 1888), American electrical engineer.
- July 20 – Margaret Reed Lewis (b. 1881), American cell biologist.
- July 29 – Emanuel Miller (b. 1892), English child psychiatrist.
- August 1 – Otto Heinrich Warburg (b. 1883), German physiologist and winner of the 1931 Nobel Prize in physiology or medicine.
- September 22 – Vojtěch Jarník (b. 1897), Czech mathematician.
