= 1965 in science =

The year 1965 in science and technology involved some significant events, listed below.

== Astronomy and space exploration ==
- February 20 – Ranger 8 crashes into the Moon after a successful mission of photographing possible landing sites for the Apollo program astronauts.
- March 23 – NASA launches Gemini 3, the United States' first two-person space flight (crew: Gus Grissom and John Young).
- August 21 – NASA launches Gemini 5 (Gordon Cooper, Pete Conrad) on the first 1-week space flight, as well as the first test of fuel cells for electrical power on such a mission.
- November 16 – Venera program: The Soviet Union launches the Venera 3 space probe from Baikonur, Kazakhstan toward Venus. (On March 1, 1966, it becomes the first spacecraft to reach the surface of another planet).
- November 26 – At the Hammaguira launch facility in the Sahara Desert, France launches a Diamant-A rocket with its first satellite, Astérix-1 on board, becoming the third country to enter space.
- Discovery of NML Cygni, a red hypergiant and the largest star known, at about 1,650 times the Sun's radius.

== Biology ==
- February 4 – Trofim Lysenko is removed from his post as director of the Institute of Genetics at the Academy of Sciences in the Soviet Union and Lysenkoist theories subjected to criticism as pseudoscience.
- Emile Zuckerkandl and Linus Pauling name their concept of the molecular clock.
- The Parma wallaby, thought for around 70 years to be extinct, is rediscovered on Kawau Island (near Auckland).
- W. Keble Martin publishes The Concise British Flora in Colour.
- The "brain-eating amoeba" Naegleria fowleri is detected for the first time.

== Chemistry ==
- Kevlar high-strength para-aramid synthetic fiber is developed by Stephanie Kwolek at DuPont.
- Wang Yinglai and colleagues perform the first successful synthesis of insulin.
- Peter Hirsch, Archibald Howie, Robin Nicholson, D. W. Pashley and Michael Whelan publish Electron Microscopy of Thin Crystals.

== Climatology ==
- November 5 – US president Lyndon Johnson's science advisory committee sends him a report entitled Restoring the Quality of Our Environment, the introduction to which states: "Pollutants have altered on a global scale the carbon dioxide content of the air and the lead concentrations in ocean waters and human populations."

== Computer science ==
- January 14 – CDC 6600 supercomputer delivered to CERN in Geneva.
- March 22 – Digital Equipment Corporation launch the 12-bit PDP-8, the first successful commercial minicomputer, which will sell more than 50,000 systems, the most of any computer up to this date.
- April 19 – Gordon Moore describes the exponential growth trend in computing power which will become known as Moore's law.

== History of science and technology ==
- Ralph Lapp publishes The New Priesthood: The Scientific Elite and the Uses of Power in the United States.
- Thomas Telford's Conwy Suspension Bridge in north Wales (1822–26), superseded as a vehicle crossing, is placed in the care of Britain's National Trust for Places of Historic Interest or Natural Beauty.

== Mathematics ==
- James Ax and Simon B. Kochen make the first proof of the Ax–Kochen theorem.
- James Cooley and John Tukey publish the general version of the Fast Fourier transform which becomes known as the Cooley–Tukey FFT algorithm and significant in digital signal processing.
- Lotfi Zadeh develops fuzzy logic.

== Physics ==
- January – Mathematician Roger Penrose publishes a key paper on gravitational collapse and space-time singularities.

== Physiology and medicine ==
- English paediatrician Harry Angelman first describes Angelman syndrome.
- English neurologist Victor Dubowitz first describes Dubowitz syndrome.
- Frank Pantridge installs the first portable defibrillator, in a Belfast ambulance.

== Psychology ==
- Konrad Lorenz publishes Evolution and Modification of Behavior.

== Technology ==
- January – Bryan Whitby and S. C. Cummins file a United Kingdom patent application for mobile ice cream producing equipment with the soft serve units powered off the ice cream van's drive mechanism (rather than a separate generator), which becomes a global standard.
- March 4 – Patent for the lava lamp filed.
- July 20 – Owen Finlay Maclaren files a UK patent application for the modern collapsible baby buggy.
- December 25 – American engineer Sherm Poppen invents the snurfer, predecessor of the snowboard.

== Awards ==
- Nobel Prizes
  - Physics – Sin-Itiro Tomonaga, Julian Schwinger, Richard P. Feynman
  - Chemistry – Robert Burns Woodward
  - Medicine – François Jacob, André Lwoff, Jacques Monod
- Order of Merit: Dorothy Hodgkin

== Births ==
- February 9 – Omar M. Yaghi, Jordanian-born chemist, winner of the Nobel Prize in Chemistry in 2025.
- March 3 – Tedros Adhanom, Ethiopian public health authority.
- March 7 – Ottoline Leyser, English plant biologist and science administrator.
- June 4 – Adi Utarini, Indonesian public health researcher.
- June 5 – Michael E. Brown, American astronomer.
- June 16 – Andrea M. Ghez, American astronomer, winner of the Nobel Prize in Physics in 2020.
- June 21 – Yang Liwei, Chinese astronaut.
- October 11 – Juan Ignacio Cirac Sasturain, Spanish physicist.

== Deaths ==
- March 30 – Philip Showalter Hench (born 1896), American physician, winner of the Nobel Prize in Physiology or Medicine in 1950.
- July 9 – Louis Harold Gray (born 1905), English physicist, inventor of the field of radiobiology.
- August 28 – Giulio Racah (born 1909), Israeli physicist.
- September 4 – Albert Schweitzer (born 1875), Alsatian medical missionary.
- September 20 – Arthur Holmes (born 1890), English geologist.
- October 12 – Paul Hermann Müller (born 1899), Swiss chemist, winner of the Nobel Prize in Physiology or Medicine in 1948.
- November 11 – Ronald Hatton (born 1886), English pomologist.
- December 11 – George Constantinescu (born 1881), Romanian-born engineer.
