= Eugen Baumann =

German chemist (1846–1896)

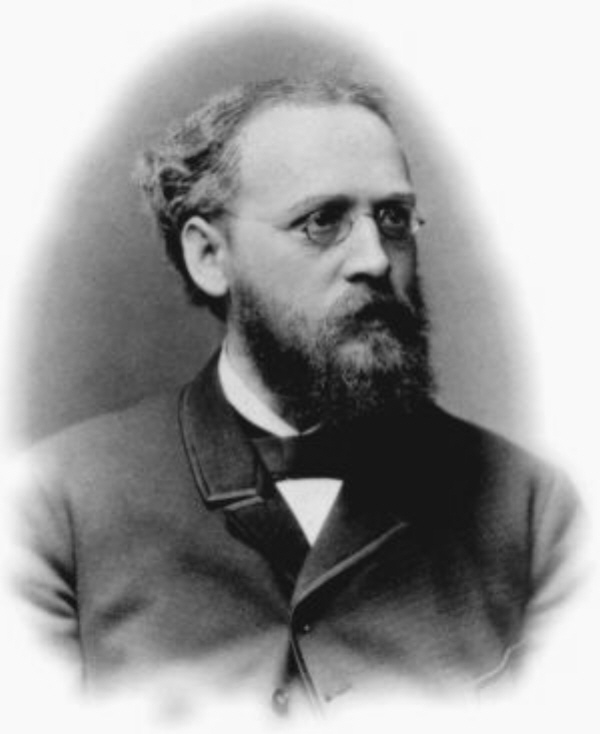
- Born: 12 December 1846; Cannstatt, Württemberg, German Confederation
- Died: 3 November 1896 (aged 49); Freiburg, Baden, Germany
- Education: University of Tübingen
- Known for: Schotten-Baumann reaction
- Scientific career
- Fields: organic chemistry, physiological chemistry
- Workplaces: University of Tübingen, University of Straßburg; University of Berlin; University of Freiburg
- Doctoral advisor: Hermann von Fehling, Felix Hoppe-Seyler

Eugen Baumann (12 December 1846 – 3 November 1896) was a German chemist. He was one of the first people to create polyvinyl chloride (PVC), and, together with Carl Schotten, he discovered the Schotten-Baumann reaction.

== Life ==
Baumann was born in Cannstatt, which is now part of Stuttgart. After he attended a gymnasium in Stuttgart, he was educated in the pharmacy of his father. During his time in Stuttgart, he attended the lectures of Hermann von Fehling at the University of Stuttgart.

To broaden his education, he went to Lübeck and Gothenburg to work in pharmacies there. Later, he studied pharmacy at the University of Tübingen. He passed his first exam in 1870 and received his PhD in 1872 for work with Felix Hoppe-Seyler. He followed Hoppe-Seyler to the University of Straßburg where did his habilitation in 1876. The same year, Emil Heinrich Du Bois-Reymond offered him a position as the Head of the Chemistry Department of the Institute of Physiology in Berlin. In 1882, Baumann became professor of medicine at that institute, and subsequently obtained professor position at the University of Freiburg.

In 1895, he took over the management of Hoppe-Seyler's Zeitschrift für Physiologische Chemie with Albrecht Kossel.

From 1883 till his death, Baumann was married to Theresa Kopp, the daughter of chemist Hermann Kopp, and they had five children. He died at the age of 49 due to a heart problem.

== Work ==
The organosulfur compounds of urine were his starting point into the physiological chemistry. He identified the source for aromatic compounds in urine being the aromatic amino acids, such as tyrosine. He influenced the organosulfur chemistry by the synthesis of thioacetals and thioketals. These substances were subsequently used by other scientists, for example for anesthesia. Together with his coworkers, he was able to prove that thyroxine was the active ingredient in the thyroid gland.

== Schotten-Baumann reaction ==
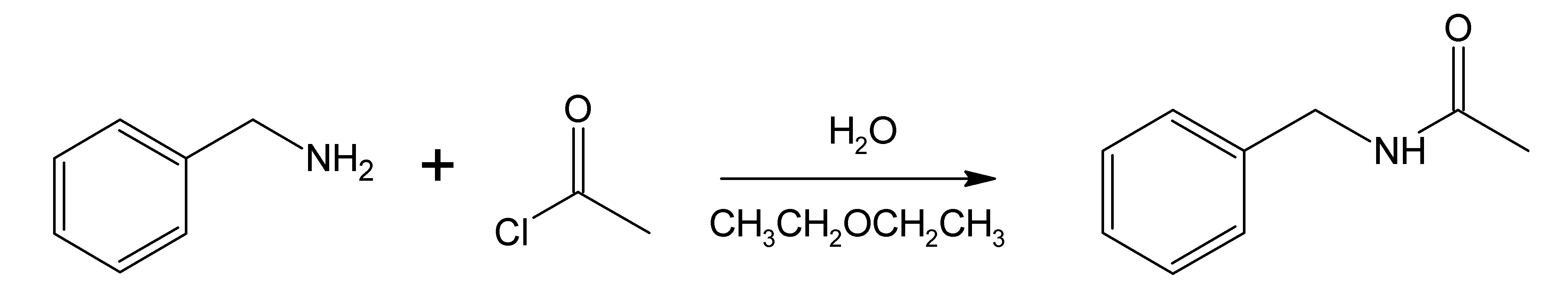
An example of a Schotten-Baumann reaction. Benzylamine reacts with acetyl chloride under Schotten-Baumann conditions to form N-benzyl acetamide.

During his work at the physiological institute, Baumann, together with Carl Schotten, discovered a method to synthesize amides from amines and acid chlorides; this method is still known as the Schotten-Baumann reaction.

== See also ==
- Polyvinyl chloride
- Sulfonmethane
- Tetronal
- Trional
