= Carl Schotten =

German chemist (1853–1910)

Carl Schotten (Karl Ludwig Johannes)
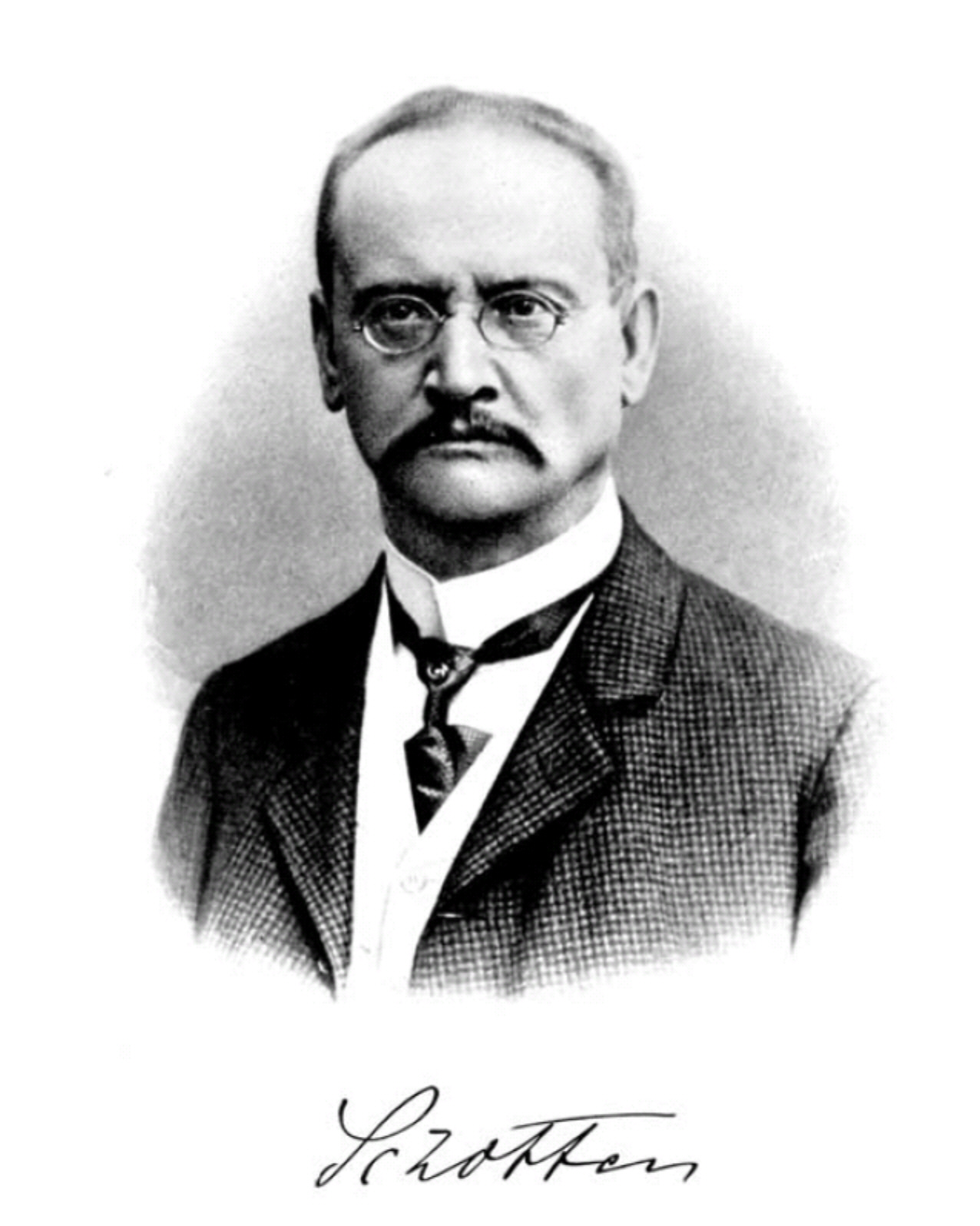
- Born: 12 July 1853; Marburg, Germany
- Died: 9 January 1910 (aged 56)
- Known for: Schotten-Baumann reaction
- Scientific career
- Workplaces: Patent Office 1891
- Doctoral advisor: Ferdinand Tiemann

Carl Schotten (12 July 1853 – 9 January 1910) was a German chemist who, together with Eugen Baumann, discovered the Schotten-Baumann reaction. The Schotten-Baumann reaction is a method to synthesize amides from amines and acid chlorides. Examples of this reaction include the synthesis of N-vanillyl nonanamide, also known as synthetic capsaicin.

== Life and work ==
Schotten was born as the third child of a syndic at the University of Marburg, his mother was a daughter of a law professor. Although he lost his father at the age of two, his intellectual family background allowed him to receive a good education. After attending the gymnasium in Marburg and Schulpforta, he studied medicine at the University of Zurich. He later moved to the University of Leipzig and changed his subject to chemistry.

Schotten joined the group of August Wilhelm von Hofmann at the University of Berlin in 1875. There, he received his Ph.D. in 1878 under the supervision of Ferdinand Tiemann. Schotten stayed three years in the private laboratory of von Hofmann. In 1881, he was invited by Emil du Bois-Reymond to become lecturer at the physiological institute at the University of Berlin. His analysis of pyridine, piperidine and coniine paved the way for the determination of the structural relations within these three compounds.

== Schotten-Baumann reaction ==
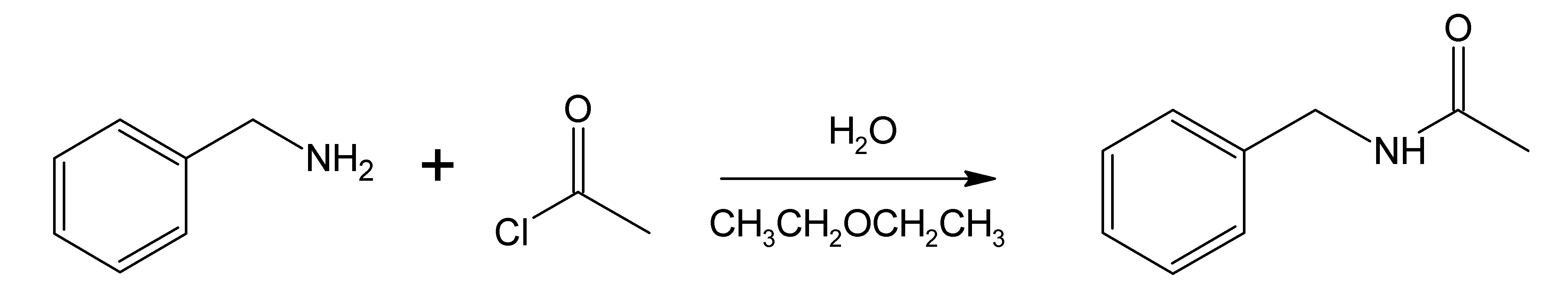
An example of a Schotten-Baumann reaction. Benzylamine reacts with acetyl chloride under Schotten-Baumann conditions to form N-benzyl acetamide.

During his work at the physiological institute, Schotten, together with Eugen Baumann, discovered a method to synthesize amides from amines and acid chlorides; this method is still known as the Schotten-Baumann reaction.

== Later life ==
Schotten stayed at Berlin University until 1891, when he changed to the imperial patent office. He held that position until his death in 1910.
