= Glutaryl chloride =

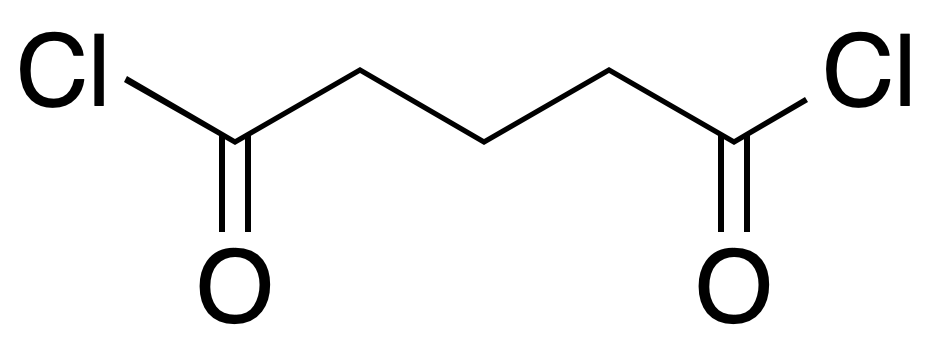

Names
- Preferred IUPAC name Pentanedioyl dichloride

Identifiers
CAS Number	2873-74-7
3D model (JSmol)	Interactive image
ChemSpider	16895
ECHA InfoCard	100.018.829
EC Number	220-711-1
PubChem CID	17887
UNII	6PPM7UQR7V
CompTox Dashboard (EPA)	DTXSID1062679
- InChI: InChI=1S/C5H6Cl2O2/c6-4(8)2-1-3-5(7)9/h1-3H2 Key: YVOFTMXWTWHRBH-UHFFFAOYSA-N
- SMILES: C(CC(=O)Cl)CC(=O)Cl

Properties
Chemical formula	C_{5}H_{6}Cl_{2}O_{2}
Molar mass	169.00 g·mol^{−1}
Density	1.324
Boiling point	217 °C (423 °F; 490 K)

Hazards
- GHS labelling
Pictograms	(GHS05: Corrosive) (GHS06: Toxic)
Signal word	Danger
Hazard statements	H301, H314
Precautionary statements	P260, P264, P270, P280, P301+P310, P301+P330+P331, P303+P361+P353, P304+P340, P305+P351+P338, P310, P321, P330, P363, P405, P501
Flash point	106 °C (223 °F; 379 K)
- Except where otherwise noted, data are given for materials in their standard state (at 25 °C [77 °F], 100 kPa). Infobox references

Glutaryl chloride or pentanedioyl dichloride is an organic compound with the formula C_{5}H_{6}Cl_{2}O_{2}, or (CH_{2})_{3}(COCl)_{2}. It is the diacid chloride derivative of glutaric acid. It is a colorless liquid although commercial samples can appear darker.
