= Transition metal acyl complexes =

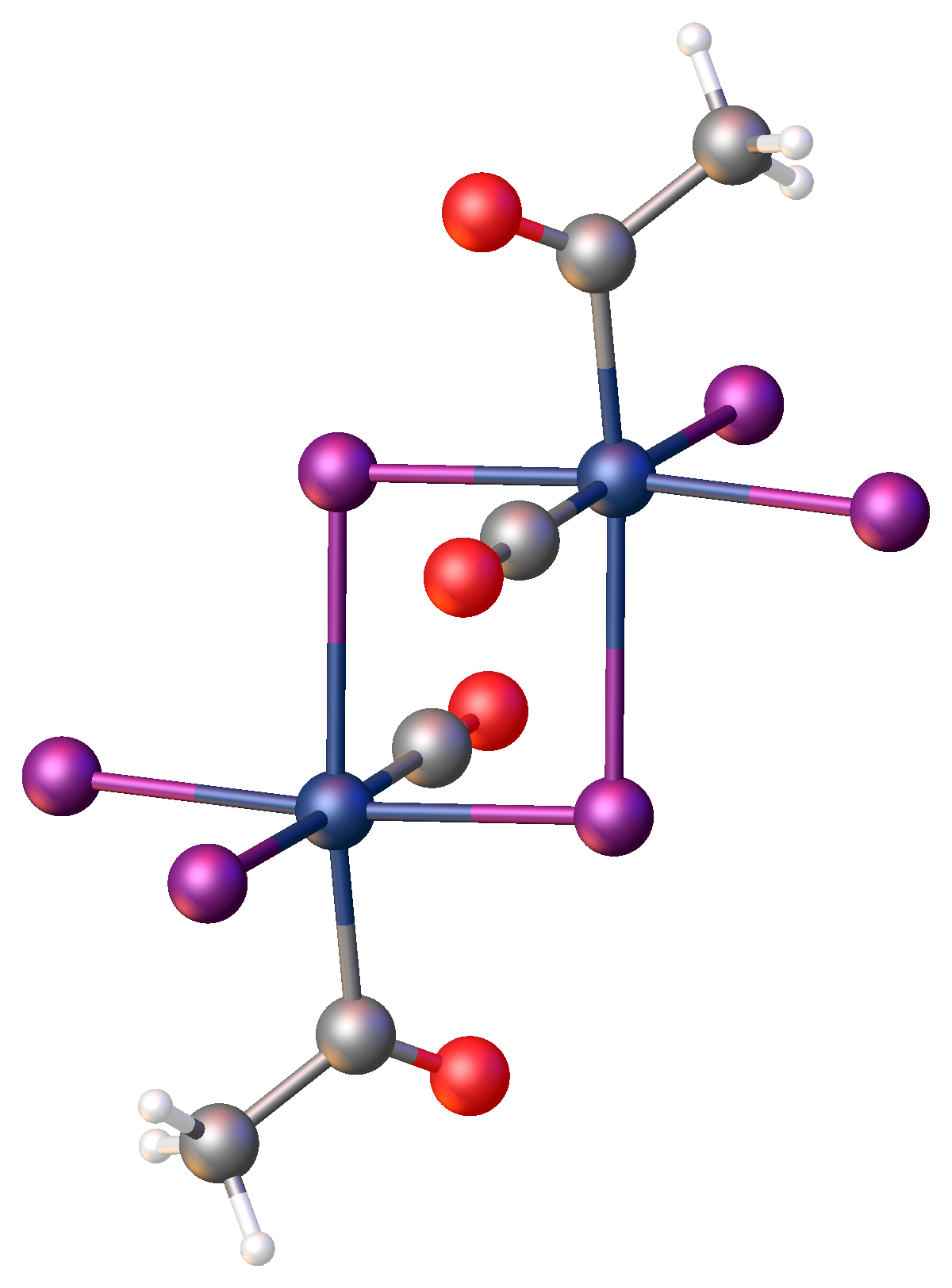
Structure of the acetyl complex [Rh_{2}I_{6}(acetyl)_{2}(CO)_{2}]^{2-}.

Transition metal acyl complexes are organometallic complexes containing one or more acyl (RCO) ligands. Such compounds occur as transient intermediates in many industrially useful reactions, especially carbonylations. Transition metal formyl complexes are special cases because they behave distinctly.

== Structure and bonding ==
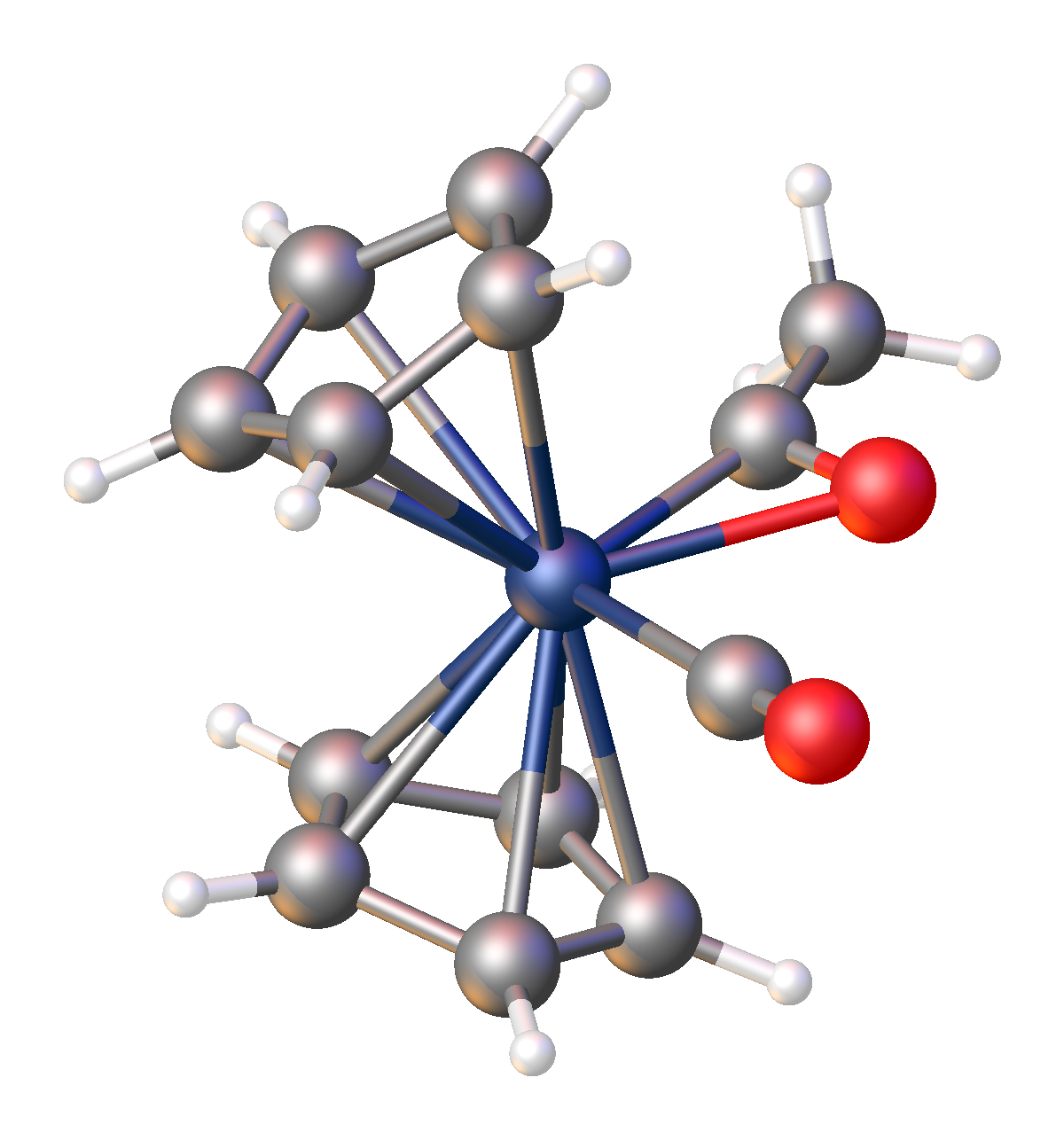
Structure of an η^{2}-acyl complex, Cp_{2}Zr(CO)(acetyl)^{+}.

Acyl complexes are usually low-spin and spin-paired.

Monometallic acyl complexes adopt one of two related structures, C-bonded and η^{2}-C-O-bonded. These forms sometimes interconvert. For the purpose of electron-counting, C-bonded acyl ligands count as 1-electron ligands, akin to pseudohalides. η^{2}-Acyl ligands count as 3-electron "L-X" ligands.

bridging acyl ligands are also well known, where the carbon bonds to one metal and the oxygen bonds to a second metal. One example is the bis(μ-acetyl) complex [(CO)_{3}Fe(C(O)CH_{3})_{2}Fe(CO)_{3}]^{2-}.

== Synthesis ==
Metal acyls are often generated by the reaction of low-valent metal centers with acyl chlorides. Illustrative is the oxidative addition of acetyl chloride to Vaska's complex, converting square planar Ir(I) to octahedral Ir(III):

Some acyl complexes can be produced from aldehydes by C-H oxidative addition. This reaction underpins hydroacylation.

In a related reaction, metal carbonyl anions are acylated by acyl chlorides:

(C_{5}H_{5})Fe(CO)_{2}Na + CH_{3}C(O)Cl → (C_{5}H_{5})Fe(CO)_{2}COCH_{3} + NaCl

Another important route to metal acyls entails insertion of CO into a metal alkyl bond. In this pathway, the alkyl ligand migrates to an adjacent CO ligand. This reaction is a step in the hydroformylation process.

Coordinatively saturated metal carbonyls react with organolithium reagents to give acyls. This reaction proceeds by attack of the alkyl nucleophile on the electrophilic CO ligand.

== Reactions ==
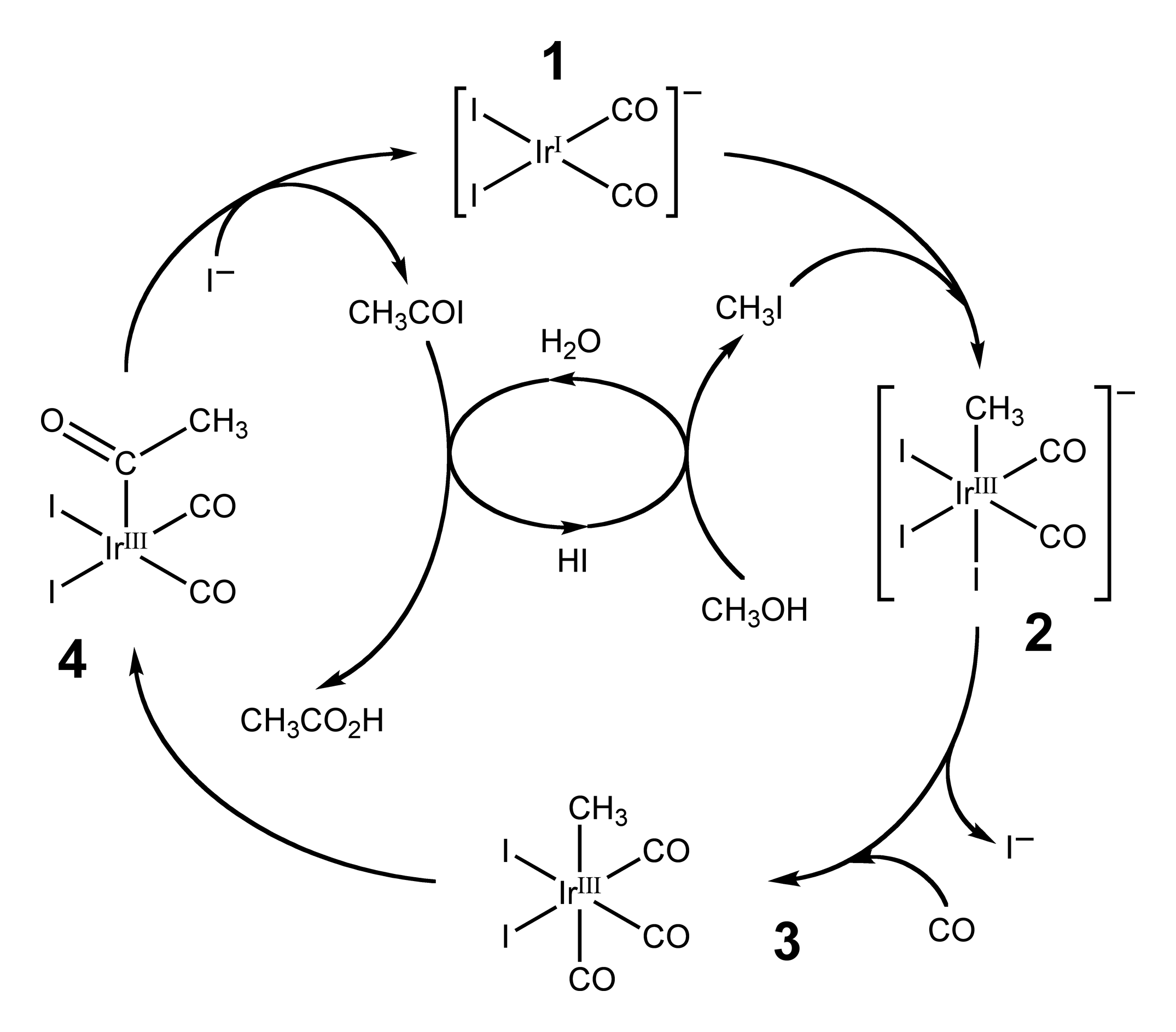
The widely used Cativa process for production of acetic acid involves a metal acyl intermediate (4).

In practical sense, the most important reaction of metal acyls is their detachment by reductive elimination of aldehydes from acyl metal hydrides:

L_{n}MC(O)R(H) → L_{n}M + RCHO

This reaction is the final step of hydroformylation.

Another important reaction is decarbonylation. This reaction requires that the acyl complex be coordinatively unsaturated:

L_{n}MC(O)R → L_{n-1}M(CO)R + L
L_{n-1}MC(O)R → L_{n-1}M(CO)R

The oxygen center of acyl ligands is basic. This aspect is manifested in O-alkylations, which converts acyl complexes to alkoxycarbene complexes:

== Applications ==
Metal acyl complexes participate in several commercial processes, including:

- hydroformylation
- acetic acid synthesis
- Eastman acetic anhydride process
- Ethylene-carbon monoxide copolymerization

A reaction involving metal acyl complexes of occasional value in organic synthesis is the Tsuji–Wilkinson decarbonylation reaction of aldehydes.
