= Terephthaloyl chloride =

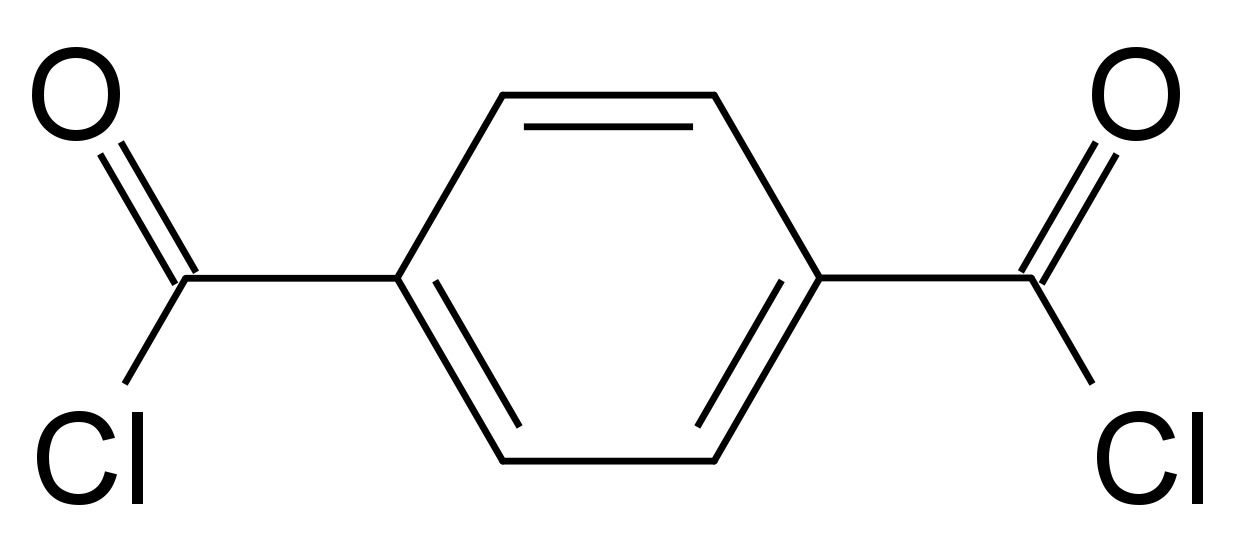
- Skeletal formula

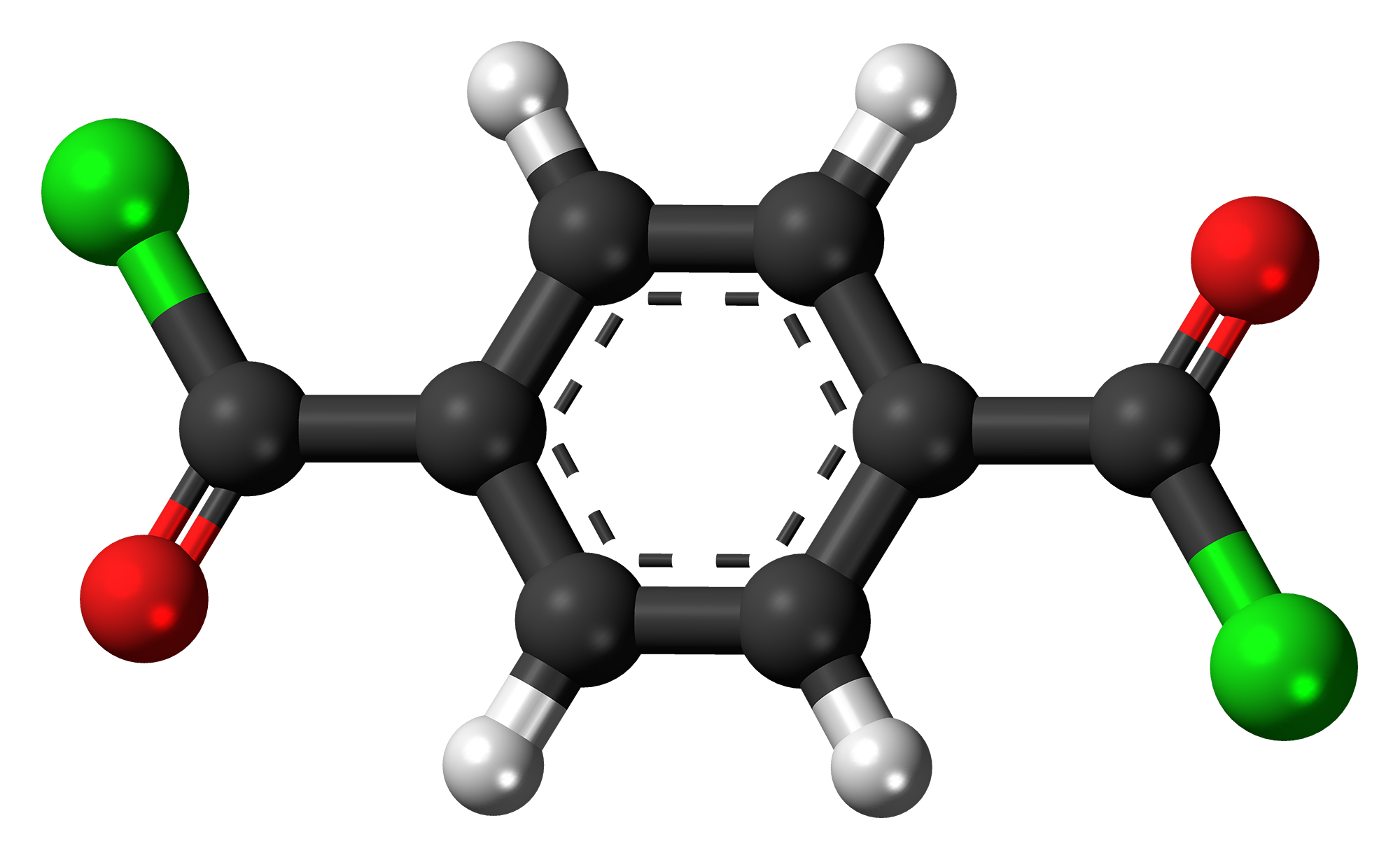

Names
- Preferred IUPAC name Benzene-1,4-dicarbonyl dichloride
- Other names Terephthaloyl dichloride 1,4-Benzenedicarbonyl chloride Benzene-1,4-dicarbonyl chloride Terephthalic acid dichloride Terephthaloyl dichloride p-Phthalyl chloride TCL

Identifiers
CAS Number	100-20-9
3D model (JSmol)	Interactive image
ChemSpider	7207
ECHA InfoCard	100.002.572
PubChem CID	7488
UNII	G247CO9608
CompTox Dashboard (EPA)	DTXSID7026653
- InChI: InChI=1S/C8H4Cl2O2/c9-7(11)5-1-2-6(4-3-5)8(10)12/h1-4H Key: LXEJRKJRKIFVNY-UHFFFAOYSA-N; InChI=1/C8H4Cl2O2/c9-7(11)5-1-2-6(4-3-5)8(10)12/h1-4H Key: LXEJRKJRKIFVNY-UHFFFAOYAY
- SMILES: O=C(Cl)c1ccc(C(Cl)=O)cc1

Properties
Chemical formula	C_{8}H_{4}Cl_{2}O_{2}
Molar mass	203.02 g/mol
Appearance	white solid
Density	1.34 g/cm^{3}
Melting point	81.5 to 83 °C (178.7 to 181.4 °F; 354.6 to 356.1 K)
Boiling point	265 °C (509 °F; 538 K)
- Except where otherwise noted, data are given for materials in their standard state (at 25 °C [77 °F], 100 kPa). verify (what is ?) Infobox references

Terephthaloyl chloride (TCL, 1,4-benzenedicarbonyl chloride) is the acyl chloride of terephthalic acid. It is a white solid at room temperature. It is one of two precursors used to make para-Aramids like Twaron or Kevlar, the other being p-phenylenediamine. TCL is used as a key component in performance polymers and aramid fibers, where it imparts flame resistance, chemical resistance, temperature stability, light weight, and very high strength. TCL is also an effective water scavenger, used to stabilize isocyanates and urethane prepolymers.

== Preparation ==
Terephthalic acid dichloride is produced commercially by the reaction of 1,4-bis(trichloromethyl)benzene with terephthalic acid:

C_{6}H_{4}(CCl_{3})_{2} + C_{6}H_{4}(CO_{2}H)_{2} → 2 C_{6}H_{4}(COCl)_{2} + 2 HCl

It can also be obtained by chlorination of dimethyl terephthalate.

== Use ==
TCL is used for making various copolymers and aramid polymers such as Heracron, Twaron and Kevlar:

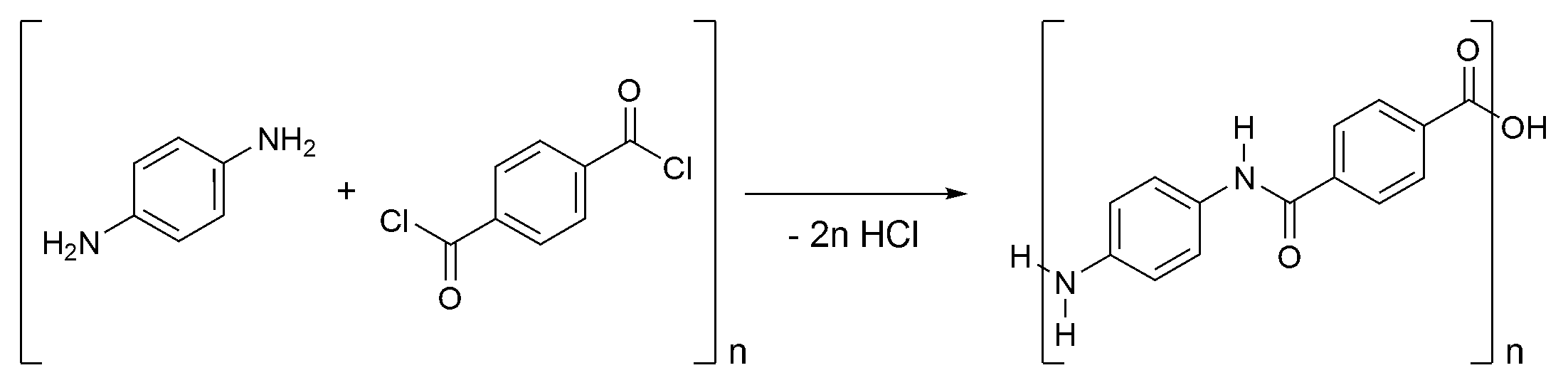
The reaction of 1,4-phenyl-diamine (para-phenylenediamine) with terephthaloyl chloride yielding Kevlar

== Related compounds ==
- Phthaloyl chloride
- Aramid
