= Sameer Zuberi (physician) =

Scottish physician

Sameer M. Zuberi

Academic work
- Institutions: Royal Hospital for Sick Children, Glasgow
- Main interests: epilepsy, paediatric neurology

Sameer Zuberi is a physician at the Royal Hospital for Sick Children in Glasgow, Scotland, and Honorary Chair in Paediatric Neurology (School of Medicine, Dentistry & Nursing) at the University of Glasgow. He is also editor of a semi-monthly academic journal, European Journal of Paediatric Neurology and has served as president of the European Paediatric Neurology Society. He received the Ambassador for Epilepsy Award of the International League Against Epilepsy.
