= Tetronal =

Chemical compound

Legal status
- Legal status: US: Schedule III

Identifiers
- IUPAC name: 3,3-bis(ethylsulfonyl)pentane
- CAS Number: 2217-59-6
- PubChem CID: 75197
- ChemSpider: 67743
- UNII: 5XG2X0OW34
- CompTox Dashboard (EPA): DTXSID10176705

Chemical and physical data
- Formula: C_{9}H_{20}O_{4}S_{2}
- Molar mass: 256.38 g·mol^{−1}
- 3D model (JSmol): Interactive image
- SMILES: CCC(CC)(S(=O)(=O)CC)S(=O)(=O)CC
- InChI: InChI=1S/C9H20O4S2/c1-5-9(6-2,14(10,11)7-3)15(12,13)8-4/h5-8H2,1-4H3; Key:VTZYVPLHCQBWSP-UHFFFAOYSA-N

Tetronal is a sedative-hypnotic and anesthetic drug with GABAergic actions. It is not as effective as trional.

== History ==
Tetronal was introduced by Eugen Baumann and Alfred Kast in 1888.

== See also ==
- Sulfonal
- Trional
