= Phthaloyl chloride =

Names
- Other names o-Phthaloyl chloride

Identifiers
| CAS Number | 88-95-9 |
| 3D model (JSmol) | Interactive image |
| ChemSpider | 13865683 |
| ECHA InfoCard | 100.001.699 |
| EC Number | 201-869-0 |
| PubChem CID | 6955 |
| UNII | 8S64APH24W |
| CompTox Dashboard (EPA) | DTXSID8038691 |
- InChI: InChI=1S/C8H4Cl2O2/c9-7(11)5-3-1-2-4-6(5)8(10)12/h1-4H Key: FYXKZNLBZKRYSS-UHFFFAOYSA-N
- SMILES: C1=CC=C(C(=C1)C(=O)Cl)C(=O)Cl

Properties
| Chemical formula | C_{8}H_{4}Cl_{2}O_{2} |
| Molar mass | 203.02 g·mol^{−1} |
| Appearance | colorless oil |
| Melting point | 15.5 °C (59.9 °F; 288.6 K) |
| Boiling point | 135 °C (275 °F; 408 K) 15 torr |

Hazards
- GHS labelling
| Pictograms | (GHS05: Corrosive) (GHS07: Exclamation mark) (GHS08: Health hazard) |
| Signal word | Warning |
| Hazard statements | H290, H312, H314, H317, H334, H335 |
| Precautionary statements | P233, P234, P260, P264, P264+P265, P271, P272, P280, P284, P301+P330+P331, P302+P352, P302+P361+P354, P304+P340, P305+P354+P338, P316, P317, P319, P321, P333+P317, P342+P316, P362+P364, P363, P390, P403, P403+P233, P405, P501 |
- Except where otherwise noted, data are given for materials in their standard state (at 25 °C [77 °F], 100 kPa). Infobox references

Phthaloyl chloride is an organic compound with the formula C_{6}H_{4}(COCl)_{2}. It is one of three isomers, the better known one being terephthaloyl chloride. The third isomer is isophthaloyl chloride. All three compounds are diacid chlorides, and hence they are susceptible to reactions with water (to give back the diacids), alcohols (to give diesters), and amines to give amides or imides.

== Synthesis and reactions ==
Phthaloyl chloride can be prepared by treatment of phthalic anhydride with phosphorus pentachloride.

Upon heating with aluminium trichloride, phthaloyl chloride rearranges to an unsymmetrical ester.

Phthaloyl chloride reacts with arenes to make anthroquinones.
