= Trional =

Chemical compound

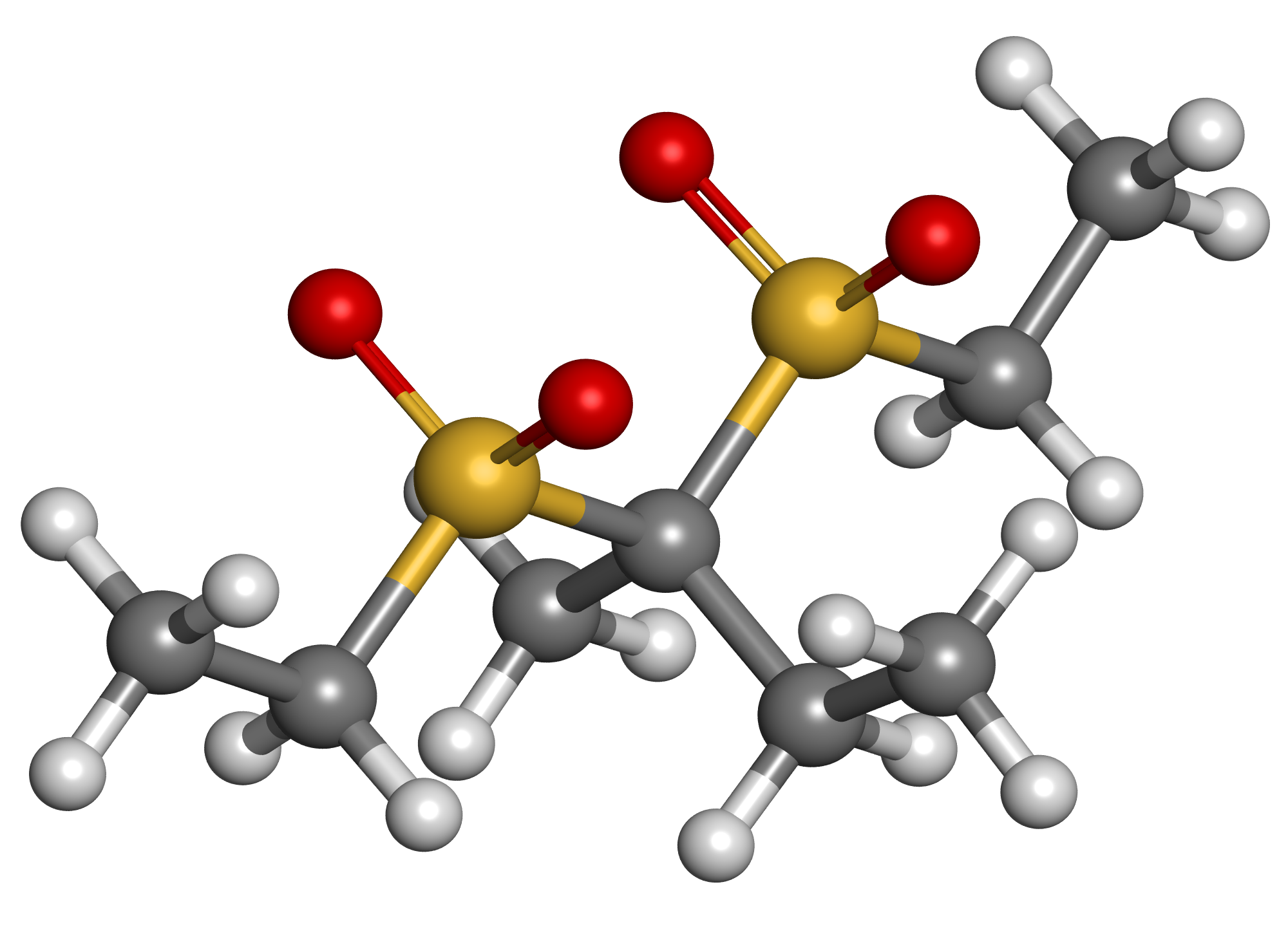

Clinical data
- ATC code: none

Legal status
- Legal status: US: Schedule III

Identifiers
- IUPAC name: 2,2-bis(ethylsulfonyl)butane
- CAS Number: 76-20-0
- PubChem CID: 6433
- ChemSpider: 6193
- UNII: 217727W28W
- CompTox Dashboard (EPA): DTXSID7046411
- ECHA InfoCard: 100.000.858

Chemical and physical data
- Formula: C_{8}H_{18}O_{4}S_{2}
- Molar mass: 242.35 g·mol^{−1}
- 3D model (JSmol): Interactive image
- SMILES: CCC(C)(S(=O)(=O)CC)S(=O)(=O)CC
- InChI: InChI=1S/C8H18O4S2/c1-5-8(4,13(9,10)6-2)14(11,12)7-3/h5-7H2,1-4H3; Key:LKACJLUUJRMGFK-UHFFFAOYSA-N

Trional (Methylsulfonal) is a sedative-hypnotic and anesthetic drug with GABAergic actions. It has similar effects to Sulfonal, except it is faster acting.

== History ==
Trional was prepared and introduced by Eugen Baumann and Alfred Kast in 1888.

== Cultural references ==
Appeared in Agatha Christie's Murder on the Orient Express, And Then There Were None, and other novels such as John Bude's The Lake District Murder as a sleep-inducing sedative; and in In Search of Lost Time (Sodom and Gomorrah) by Marcel Proust as a hypnotic. Sax Rohmer also references trional in his novel Dope.

== See also ==
- Sulfonal
- Tetronal
