= Transition metal formyl complex =

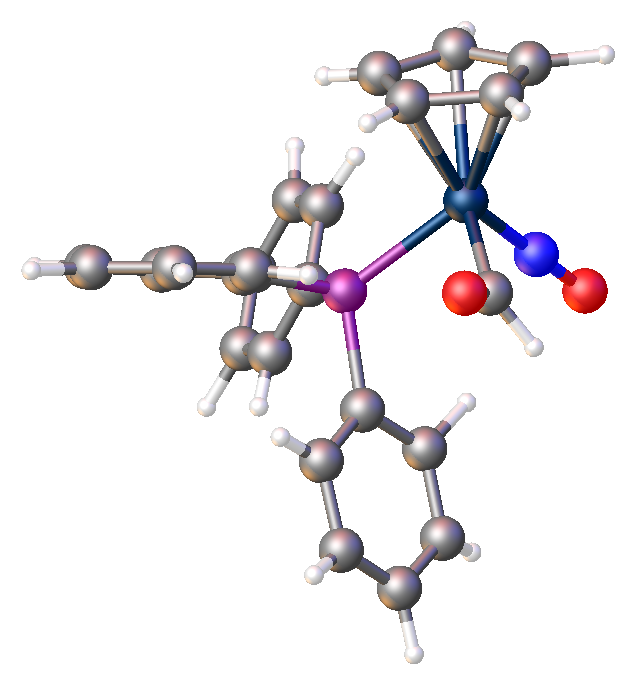
Structure of the formyl complex CpRe(PPh_{3})(NO)CHO. Selected distances: d_{HC-O} = 122.1, d_{HC-Re} = 205.5, d_{ON-Re} = 177.7 pm.

In organometallic chemistry, a transition metal formyl complex is a metal complex containing one or more formyl (CHO) ligands. A subset of transition metal acyl complexes, formyl complexes can be viewed as metalla-aldehydes. A representative example is (CO)_{5}ReCHO. Metal formyls are proposed as intermediates in the hydrogenation of carbon monoxide, as occurs in the Fischer-Tropsch process.

== Structure and bonding ==
The formyl is viewed as an X (pseudohalide) ligand. The MCHO group is planar. A C=O double bond is indicated by X-ray crystallography. A second resonance structure has a M=C double bond, with negative charge on oxygen.

M−C(=O)H ↔ M^{+}=C(−O^{−})H

== Synthesis and reactions ==
Metal formyl complexes are often prepared by the reaction of metal carbonyls with hydride reagents:

[Re(CO)_{6}]^{+} + H^{−} → (CO)_{5}ReCHO

The CO ligand is the electrophile and the hydride (provided typically from a borohydride) is the nucleophile.

Some metal formyls are produced by reaction of metal carbonyl anions with reagents that donate the equivalent of a formyl cation, such a mixed formate anhydrides.

The insertion of CO into a Rh-H bond has been observed.

Metal formyls participate in many reactions. O-alkylation gives carbenoid complexes:

L_{n}M−C(=O)H + RX → [L_{n}M=C(−OR)H]^{+}X^{−}

The formyl ligand also functions as a base, allowing the formation of M-CH=O-M' linkages. Decarbonylation leads to de-insertion of the carbonyl, yielding hydride complexes.
