= Sulfonmethane =

Chemical compound

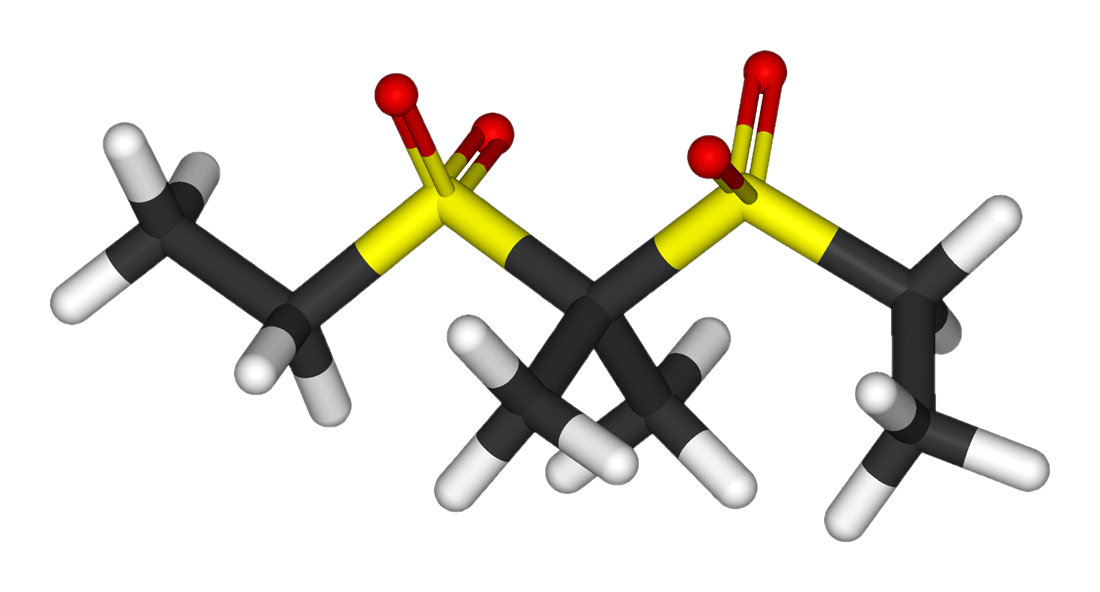

Clinical data
- ATC code: none

Legal status
- Legal status: US: Schedule III

Identifiers
- IUPAC name: 2,2-bis(ethylsulfonyl)propane
- CAS Number: 115-24-2
- PubChem CID: 8262
- ChemSpider: 7964
- UNII: W00D22B592
- CompTox Dashboard (EPA): DTXSID3048574
- ECHA InfoCard: 100.003.704

Chemical and physical data
- Formula: C_{7}H_{16}O_{4}S_{2}
- Molar mass: 228.32 g·mol^{−1}
- 3D model (JSmol): Interactive image
- SMILES: O=S(=O)(C(C)(C)S(=O)(=O)CC)CC
- InChI: InChI=1S/C7H16O4S2/c1-5-12(8,9)7(3,4)13(10,11)6-2/h5-6H2,1-4H3; Key:CESKLHVYGRFMFP-UHFFFAOYSA-N

Sulfonmethane (sulfonomethane, sulfonal, acetone diethyl sulfone) is a chemical compound first synthesized by Eugen Baumann in 1888 and introduced as a hypnotic drug by Alfred Kast later on, but now superseded by newer and safer sedatives. Its appearance is either in colorless crystalline or powdered form. In United States, it is scheduled as a Schedule III drug in the Controlled Substances Act.

== Chemistry ==
Sulfonal is prepared by condensing acetone with ethyl mercaptan in the presence of hydrochloric acid, the mercaptol (CH_{3})_{2}C(SC_{2}H_{5})_{2} formed being subsequently oxidized by potassium permanganate. It is also formed by the action of alcoholic potash and methyl iodide on ethylidene diethyl sulfine, CH_{3}CH(SO_{2}C_{2}H_{5})_{2} (which is formed by the oxidation of dithioacetal with potassium permanganate). It crystallizes in prisms melting at 125 C, which are practically insoluble in cold water, but dissolves in 15 parts of hot water and also in alcohol and ether.

== See also ==
- Trional
- Tetronal
