= Lumière–Barbier method =

The Lumière–Barbier method is a method of acetylating aromatic amines in aqueous solutions. Illustrative is the acetylation of aniline. First aniline is dissolved in water using one equivalent of hydrochloric acid. This solution is subsequently treated, sequentially, with acetic anhydride and aqueous sodium acetate. Aniline attacks acetic anhydride followed by deprotonation of the ammonium ion:

Acetate then acts as a leaving group:

The acetanilide product is insoluble in water and can therefore be filtered off as crystals.

== See also ==
- Schotten–Baumann reaction
