= Amide =

Organic compounds of the form RC(=O)NR′R″

General structure of an amide (specifically, a carboxamide)

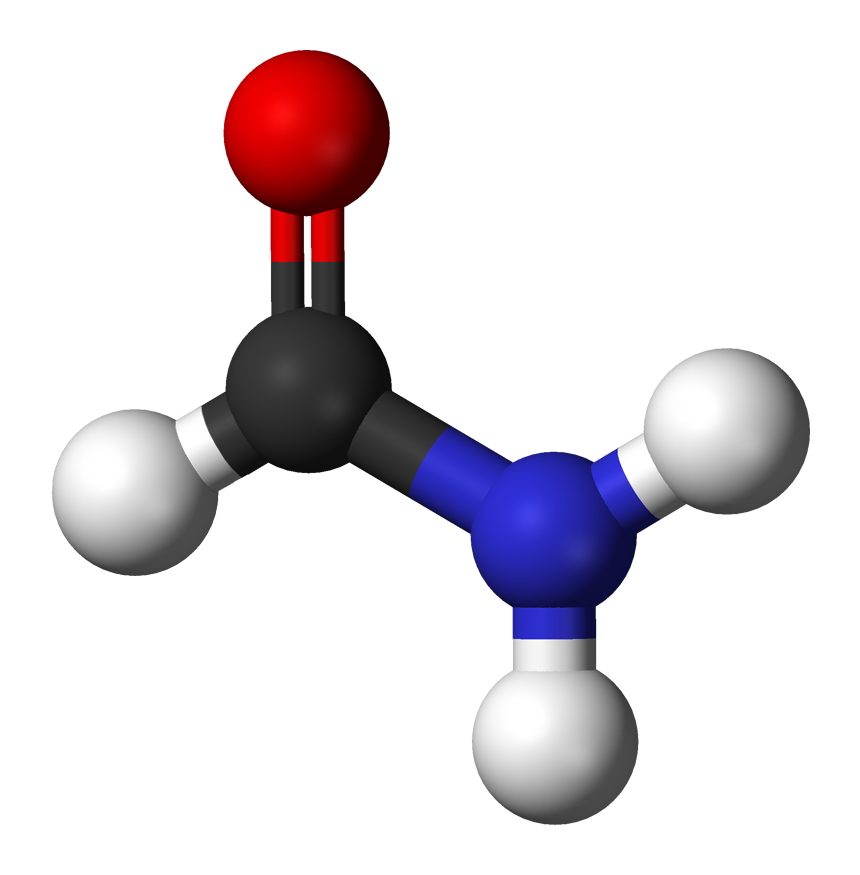
Formamide, the simplest amide

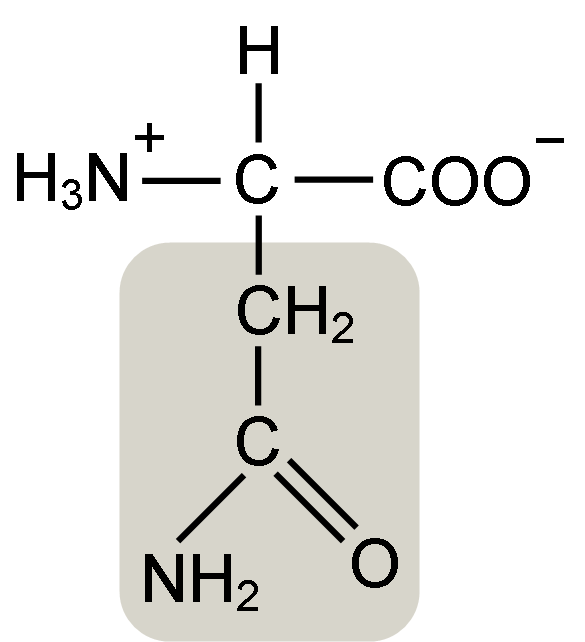
Asparagine (zwitterionic form), an amino acid with a side chain (highlighted) containing an amide group

In organic chemistry, an amide, also known as an organic amide or a carboxamide, is a compound with the general formula R−C(=O)−NR′R″, where R, R', and R″ represent any group, typically organyl groups or hydrogen atoms. The amide functional group plays an important role in the chemistry of life where, as peptide bonds, they link amino acids together to form proteins.

Amides can be viewed as a derivative of a carboxylic acid (R−C(=O)−OH) with the hydroxyl group (−OH) replaced by an amino group (−NR′R″); or, equivalently, an acyl (alkanoyl) group (R−C(=O)−) joined to an amino group.

Common amides are formamide (H−C(=O)−NH_{2}), acetamide (H_{3}C−C(=O)−NH_{2}), benzamide (C_{6}H_{5}−C(=O)−NH_{2}), and dimethylformamide (H−C(=O)−N(−CH_{3})_{2}).

Amides are qualified as primary, secondary, and tertiary according to the number of acyl groups bounded to the nitrogen atom.

== Nomenclature ==
The core −C(=O)−(N) of amides is called the amide group (specifically, carboxamide group).

In the usual nomenclature, one adds the term "amide" to the stem of the parent acid's name. For instance, the amide derived from acetic acid is named acetamide (CH_{3}CONH_{2}). IUPAC recommends ethanamide, but this and related formal names are rarely encountered. When the amide is derived from a primary or secondary amine, the substituents on nitrogen are indicated first in the name. Thus, the amide formed from dimethylamine and acetic acid is N,N-dimethylacetamide (CH_{3}CONMe_{2}, where Me = CH_{3}). Usually even this name is simplified to dimethylacetamide. Cyclic amides are called lactams; they are necessarily secondary or tertiary amides.

== Applications ==
Amides are pervasive in nature and technology. Proteins and important plastics like nylons, aramids, Twaron, and Kevlar are polymers whose units are connected by amide groups (polyamides); these linkages are easily formed, confer structural rigidity, and resist hydrolysis. Amides include many other important biological compounds, as well as many drugs like paracetamol, penicillin and LSD. Low-molecular-weight amides, such as dimethylformamide, are common solvents.

== Structure and bonding ==
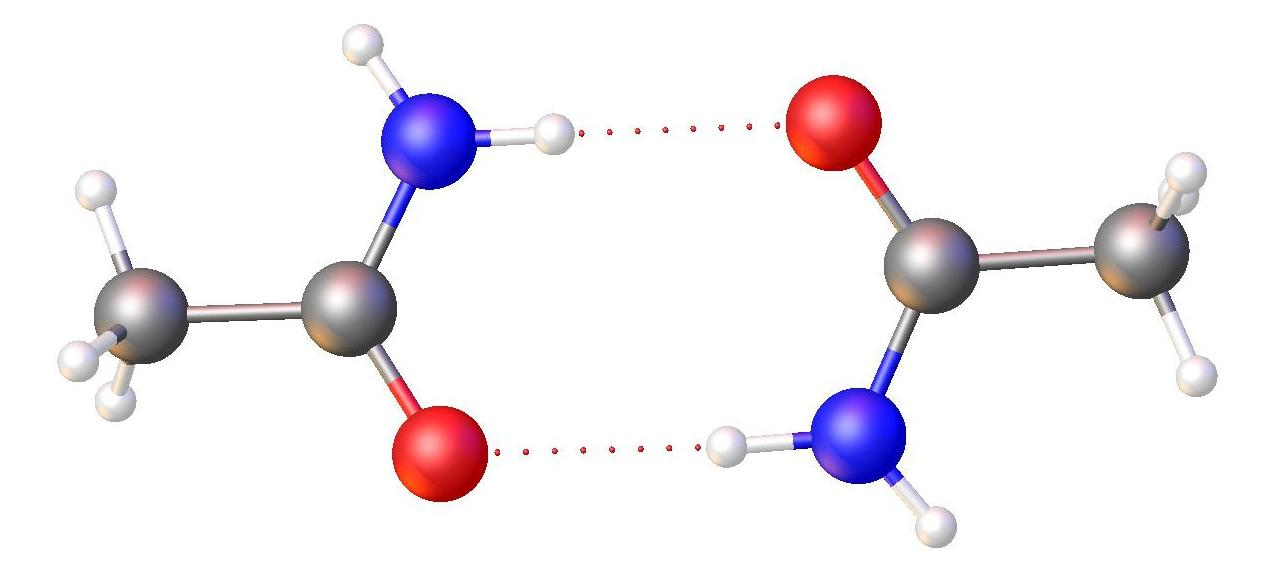
Structure of acetamide hydrogen-bonded dimer from X-ray crystallography. Selected distances: C-O: 1.243, C-N, 1.325, N---O, 2.925 Å. Color code: red = O, blue = N, gray = C, white = H.

The lone pair of electrons on the nitrogen atom is delocalized into the Carbonyl group, thus forming a partial double bond between nitrogen and carbon. In fact the O, C and N atoms have molecular orbitals occupied by delocalized electrons, forming a conjugated system. Consequently, the three bonds of the nitrogen in amides is not pyramidal (as in the amines) but planar. This planar restriction prevents rotations about the N linkage and thus has important consequences for the mechanical properties of bulk material of such molecules, and also for the configurational properties of macromolecules built by such bonds. The inability to rotate distinguishes amide groups from ester groups which allow rotation and results in a more flexible bulk material.

The C-C(O)NR_{2} core of amides is planar. The C=O distance is shorter than the C-N distance by almost 10%. The structure of an amide can be described also as a resonance between two alternative structures: neutral (A) and zwitterionic (B).

It is estimated that for acetamide, structure A makes a 62% contribution to the structure, while structure B makes a 28% contribution (these figures do not sum to 100% because there are additional less-important resonance forms that are not depicted above). Resonance is largely prevented in the very strained quinuclidone.

In their IR spectra, amides exhibit a moderately intense ν_{CO} band near 1650 cm^{−1}. The energy of this band is about 60 cm_{−1} lower than for the ν_{CO} of esters and ketones. This difference reflects the contribution of the zwitterionic resonance structure.

=== Basicity ===
Compared to amines, amides are very weak bases. While the conjugate acid of an amine has a pK_{a} of about 9.5, the conjugate acid of an amide has a pK_{a} around −0.5. Therefore, compared to amines, amides do not have acid–base properties that are as noticeable in water. This relative lack of basicity is explained by the withdrawing of electrons from the amine by the carbonyl. On the other hand, amides are much stronger bases than carboxylic acids, esters, aldehydes, and ketones (their conjugate acids' pK_{a}s are between −6 and −10).

The proton of a primary or secondary amide does not dissociate readily; its pK_{a} is usually well above 15. Conversely, under extremely acidic conditions, the carbonyl oxygen can become protonated with a pK_{a} of roughly −1. It is not only because of the positive charge on the nitrogen but also because of the negative charge on the oxygen gained through resonance.

=== Hydrogen bonding and solubility ===
Because of the greater electronegativity of oxygen than nitrogen, the carbonyl (C=O) is a stronger dipole than the N–C dipole. The presence of a C=O dipole and, to a lesser extent a N–C dipole, allows amides to act as H-bond acceptors. In primary and secondary amides, the presence of N–H dipoles allows amides to function as H-bond donors as well. Thus amides can participate in hydrogen bonding with water and other protic solvents; the oxygen atom can accept hydrogen bonds from water and the N–H hydrogen atoms can donate H-bonds. As a result of interactions such as these, the water solubility of amides is greater than that of corresponding hydrocarbons. These hydrogen bonds also have an important role in the secondary structure of proteins.

The solubilities of amides and esters are roughly comparable. Typically amides are less soluble than comparable amines and carboxylic acids since these compounds can both donate and accept hydrogen bonds. Tertiary amides, with the important exception of N,N-dimethylformamide, exhibit low solubility in water.

== Reactions ==
Amides do not readily participate in nucleophilic substitution reactions. Amides are stable to water, and are roughly 100 times more stable towards hydrolysis than esters. Amides can, however, be hydrolyzed to carboxylic acids in the presence of acid or base. The stability of amide bonds has biological implications, since the amino acids that make up proteins are linked with amide bonds. Amide bonds are resistant enough to hydrolysis to maintain protein structure in aqueous environments but are susceptible to catalyzed hydrolysis.

Primary and secondary amides do not react usefully with carbon nucleophiles. Instead, Grignard reagents and organolithiums deprotonate an amide N-H bond. Tertiary amides do not experience this problem, and react with carbon nucleophiles to give ketones; the amide anion (NR_{2}^{−}) is a very strong base and thus a very poor leaving group, so nucleophilic attack only occurs once. When reacted with carbon nucleophiles, N,N-dimethylformamide (DMF) can be used to introduce a formyl group.

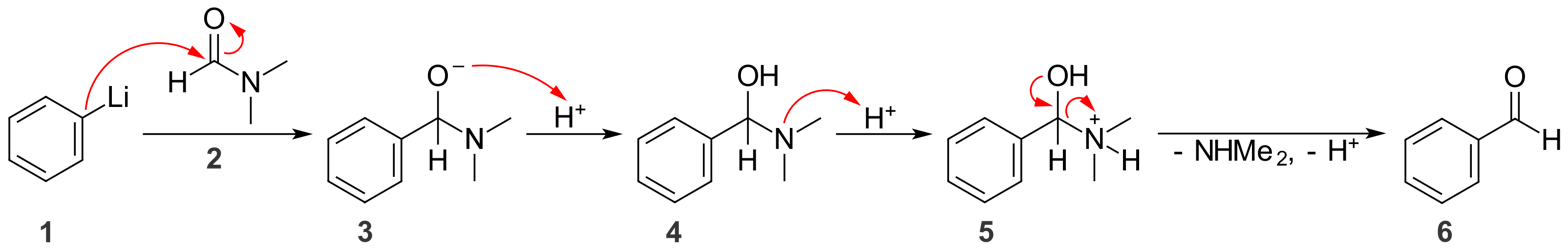
Because tertiary amides only react once with organolithiums, they can be used to introduce aldehyde and ketone functionalities. Here, DMF serves as a source of the formyl group in the synthesis of benzaldehyde.

Here, phenyllithium 1 attacks the carbonyl group of DMF 2, giving tetrahedral intermediate 3. Because the dimethylamide anion is a poor leaving group, the intermediate does not collapse and another nucleophilic addition does not occur. Upon acidic workup, the alkoxide is protonated to give 4, then the amine is protonated to give 5. Elimination of a neutral molecule of dimethylamine and loss of a proton give benzaldehyde, 6.

A new class of amide reactions was discovered in 2015 by the research teams of Neil Garg and Ken Houk, showing that amides can be converted to esters using nickel catalysis. The nickel catalyst breaks the ordinarily strong amide C-N bond through oxidative addition. Many other amide cross-couplings were subsequently developed using nickel or palladium catalysis, including Suzuki-Miyaura couplings, allowing for amides to be readily converted to numerous other functional groups.

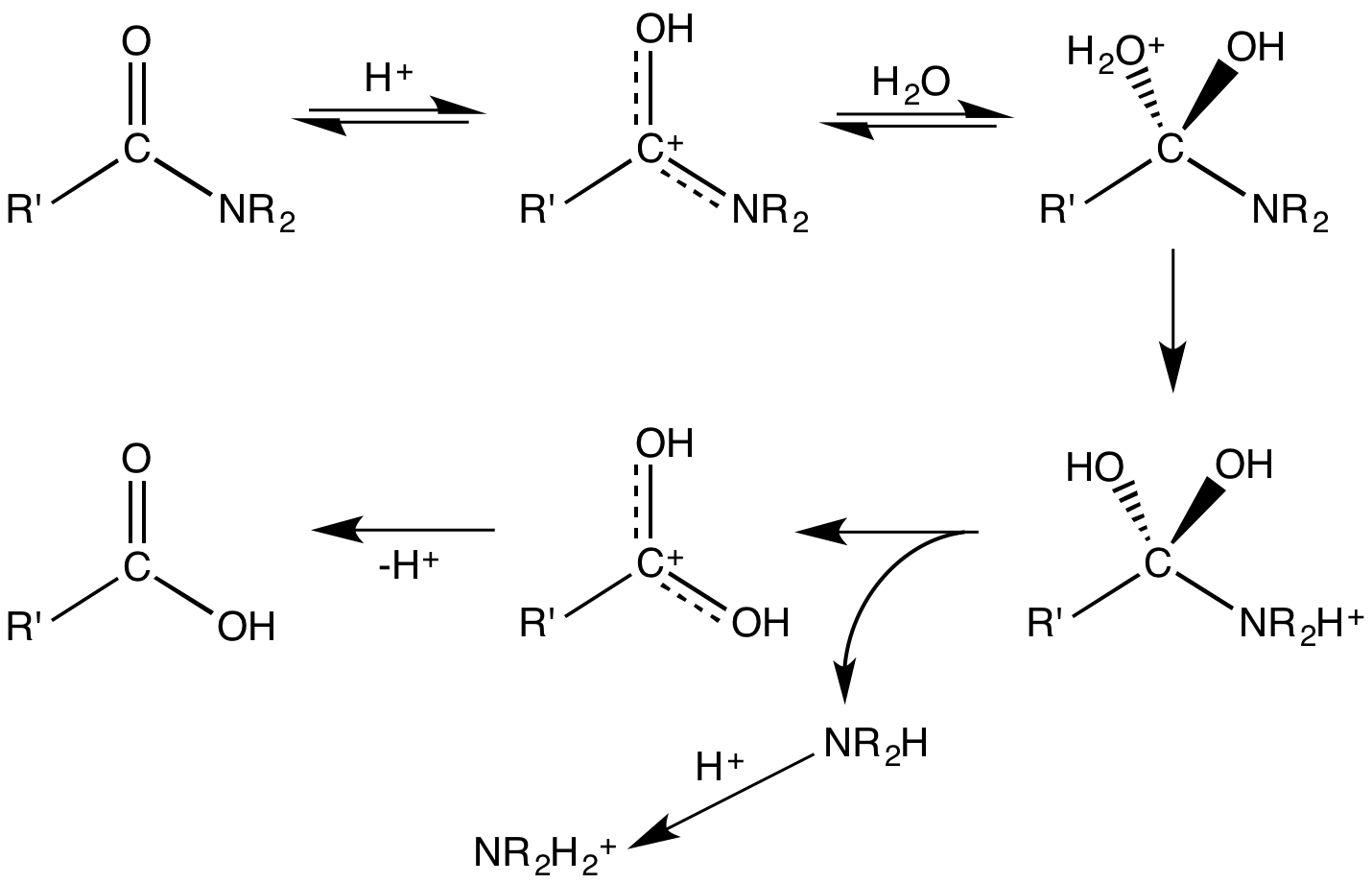
Mechanism for acid-mediated hydrolysis of an amide.

=== Hydrolysis ===
Amides hydrolyse in hot alkali as well as in strong acidic conditions. Acidic conditions yield the carboxylic acid and the ammonium ion while basic hydrolysis yield the carboxylate ion and ammonia. The protonation of the initially generated amine under acidic conditions and the deprotonation of the initially generated carboxylic acid under basic conditions render these processes non-catalytic and irreversible. Electrophiles other than protons react with the carbonyl oxygen. This step often precedes hydrolysis, which is catalyzed by both Brønsted acids and Lewis acids. Peptidase enzymes and some synthetic catalysts often operate by attachment of electrophiles to the carbonyl oxygen.

| Reaction name | Product | Comment |
|---|---|---|
| Dehydration | Nitrile | Reagent: phosphorus pentoxide; benzenesulfonyl chloride; TFAA/py |
| Hofmann rearrangement | Amine with one fewer carbon atom | Reagents: bromine and sodium hydroxide |
| Amide reduction | Amines, aldehydes | Reagent: lithium aluminium hydride followed by hydrolysis |
| Vilsmeier–Haack reaction | Aldehyde (via imine) | POCl_{3}, aromatic substrate, formamide |
| Bischler–Napieralski reaction | Cyclic aryl imine | POCl_{3}, SOCl_{2}, etc. |
| Tautomeric chlorination | Imidoyl chloride | Oxophilic halogenating agents, e.g. COCl_{2} or SOCl_{2} |

== Synthesis ==
=== From carboxylic acids and related compounds ===
Amides are usually prepared by coupling a carboxylic acid with an amine. The direct reaction generally requires high temperatures to drive off the water:

RCO_{2}H + R'_{2}NH → RCO^{−}_{2} + R'_{2}NH^{+}_{2}
RCO^{−}_{2} + R'_{2}NH^{+}_{2} → RC(O)NR'_{2} + H_{2}O

Esters are far superior substrates relative to carboxylic acids.

Further "activating" both acid chlorides (Schotten-Baumann reaction) and anhydrides (Lumière–Barbier method) react with amines to give amides:

RCO_{2}R" + R'_{2}NH → RC(O)NR'_{2} + R"OH
RCOCl + 2R'_{2}NH → RC(O)NR'_{2} + R'_{2}NH^{+}_{2}Cl^{−}
(RCO)_{2}O + R'_{2}NH → RC(O)NR'_{2} + RCO_{2}H

Peptide synthesis use coupling agents such as HATU, HOBt, or PyBOP.

Coupling of an acid chloride and an amine are quite common. The nucleophilic amine will attack the carbonyl carbon and kick off Cl as it is a good leaving group. Often, a base like pyridine, triethylamine or dimethylaminopyridine (DMAP) is added as a "molecular sponge" to soak up the released Cl ions to form a salt. This is especially helpful if a final product is acid sensitive because some reactions may produce HCl as a byproduct.

=== From nitriles ===
The hydrolysis of nitriles is conducted on an industrial scale to produce fatty amides. Laboratory procedures are also available.

=== Specialty routes ===
Many specialized methods also yield amides. A variety of reagents, e.g. tris(2,2,2-trifluoroethyl) borate have been developed for specialized applications.

Specialty Routes to Amides
| Reaction name | Substrate | Details |
|---|---|---|
| Beckmann rearrangement | Cyclic ketone | Reagent: hydroxylamine and acid |
| Schmidt reaction | Ketones | Reagent: hydrazoic acid |
| Willgerodt–Kindler reaction | Aryl alkyl ketones | Sulfur and morpholine |
| Passerini reaction | Carboxylic acid, ketone or aldehyde | |
| Ugi reaction | Isocyanide, carboxylic acid, ketone, primary amine | |
| Bodroux reaction | Carboxylic acid, Grignard reagent with an aniline derivative ArNHR' | |
| Chapman rearrangement | Aryl imino ether | For N,N-diaryl amides. The reaction mechanism is based on a nucleophilic aromatic substitution. |
| Leuckart amide synthesis | Isocyanate | Reaction of arene with isocyanate catalysed by aluminium trichloride, formation of aromatic amide. |
| Ritter reaction | Alkenes, alcohols, or other carbonium ion sources | Secondary amides via an addition reaction between a nitrile and a carbonium ion in the presence of concentrated acids. |
| Photolytic addition of formamide to olefins | Terminal alkenes | A free radical homologation reaction between a terminal alkene and formamide. |
| Dehydrogenative coupling | alcohol, amine | requires ruthenium dehydrogenation catalyst |
| Transamidation | amide | typically slow |

== See also ==
- Amidogen
- Amino radical
- Imidic acid
- Metal amides
