= European Journal of Paediatric Neurology =

Peer-reviewed medical journal

- Discipline: Pediatric Neurology
- Language: English
- Edited by: Sameer Zuberi

Publication details
- Publisher: Elsevier on behalf of the European Paediatric Neurology Society
- Frequency: Bimonthly
- Impact factor: 2.496 (2018)

Standard abbreviations
- ISO 4: Eur. J. Paediatr. Neurol.

Indexing
- ISSN: 1090-3798 (print); 1532-2130 (web)
- OCLC no.: 35279613

Links
- Journal homepage; Online access; Online archive

The European Journal of Paediatric Neurology is a bimonthly peer-reviewed medical journal that covers all aspects of pediatric neurology. It was established in 1997 and is published by Elsevier on behalf of the European Paediatric Neurology Society. The first issue was published by Saunders on behalf of the EPNS. The editor-in-chief is Sameer Zuberi (S. M. Zuberi) of the Royal Hospital for Children, Glasgow, Glasgow, United Kingdom.

== Abstracting and indexing ==
The journal is abstracted and indexed in:

- MEDLINE
- PubMed
- Index medicus
