= USS Hartford =

Two ships of the United States Navy have borne the name USS Hartford, named in honor of Hartford, the capital of Connecticut.

- USS Hartford (1858), was a sloop-of-war, commissioned in 1859 and finally disposed of in 1957.
- USS Hartford (SSN-768), is a Los Angeles-class submarine, commissioned in 1994 and currently in service.
