= Schotten–Baumann reaction =

Method to synthesize amides from amines and acid chlorides

Schotten-Baumann reaction
Named after	Carl Schotten; Eugen Baumann
Reaction type	Condensation reaction

Identifiers
Organic Chemistry Portal	schotten-baumann-reaction
RSC ontology ID	RXNO:0000165

The Schotten–Baumann reaction is a method to synthesize amides from amines and acid chlorides:

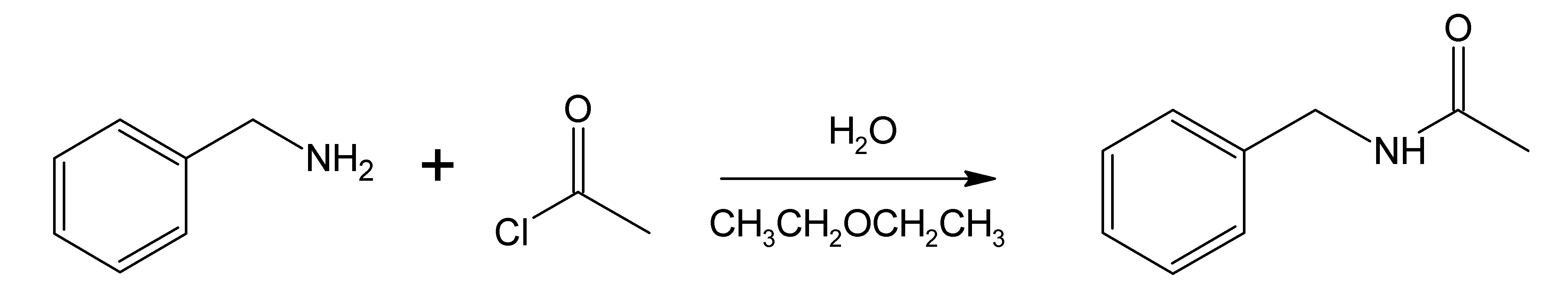
An example of a Schotten-Baumann reaction. Benzylamine reacts with acetyl chloride under Schotten-Baumann conditions to form N-benzylacetamide.

Schotten–Baumann reaction conditions can also refer to the formation of esters by reaction of an acyl chloride with a primary or secondary alcohol. The reaction was first described in 1883 by German chemists Carl Schotten and Eugen Baumann.

The name "Schotten–Baumann reaction conditions" often indicate the use of a two-phase solvent system, consisting of water and an organic solvent. The base in the water phase neutralizes the acid generated by the reaction while the starting materials and product remain in the organic phase, often dichloromethane or diethyl ether.

== Applications ==
The Schotten–Baumann reaction is widely used in organic chemistry. The industrial synthesis of flutamide, a nonsteroidal antiandrogen pharmaceutical drug, serves as a good example.

In the Fischer peptide synthesis (Emil Fischer, 1903), an α-chloro acid chloride is condensed with the ester of an amino acid. The ester is then hydrolyzed and the acid converted to the acid chloride, enabling the extension of the peptide chain by another unit. In a final step the chloride atom is replaced by an amino group, completing the peptide synthesis.

== See also ==
- Lumière–Barbier method
