= 1,4-Bis(trichloromethyl)benzene =

Names
- Preferred IUPAC name 1,4-Bis(trichloromethyl)benzene
- Other names hexachloroxylene; hexachloroparaxylene; Chloxil; Chloxyl

Identifiers
CAS Number	68-36-0
3D model (JSmol)	Interactive image
ChEMBL	ChEMBL3182002
ChemSpider	5997
ECHA InfoCard	100.000.624
EC Number	200-686-3
PubChem CID	6233
UNII	42CH2735EU
CompTox Dashboard (EPA)	DTXSID7026366
- InChI: InChI=1S/C8H4Cl6/c9-7(10,11)5-1-2-6(4-3-5)8(12,13)14/h1-4H Key: OTEKOJQFKOIXMU-UHFFFAOYSA-N
- SMILES: C1=CC(=CC=C1C(Cl)(Cl)Cl)C(Cl)(Cl)Cl

Properties
Appearance	white solid
Density	1.778 g/cm^{3}
Melting point	108–110 °C (226–230 °F; 381–383 K)
Boiling point	213 °C (415 °F; 486 K)

Hazards
- GHS labelling
Pictograms	(GHS05: Corrosive) (GHS06: Toxic)
Signal word	Danger
Hazard statements	H301, H311, H314, H331
Precautionary statements	P260, P264, P270, P271, P280, P301+P310, P301+P330+P331, P302+P352, P303+P361+P353, P304+P340, P305+P351+P338, P310, P311, P312, P321, P322, P330, P361, P363, P403+P233, P405, P501
- Except where otherwise noted, data are given for materials in their standard state (at 25 °C [77 °F], 100 kPa). Infobox references

1,4-Bis(trichloromethyl)benzene is an organic compound with the formula C_{6}H_{4}(CCl_{3})_{2}. A white solid, it is prepared industrially by chlorination of para-xylene. It reacts with terephthalic acid to give terephthaloyl chloride, a precursor to Kevlar. It also reacts with sulfur dioxide to give the same acid chloride and thionyl chloride. It reacts with hydrogen fluoride in 1,2-dichloroethane to form 1,4-bis(chlorodifluoromethyl)benzene in a yield of 79%.

== See also ==
- Benzotrichloride
