= Lilly Dubowitz =

British paediatrician (1920–2016)

Lilly Magdalene Suzanne Dubowitz (née Sebők; 20 March 1930 – 14 March 2016) was a Hungarian-born British paediatrician who together with her husband, the British neurologist Victor Dubowitz, developed the Dubowitz Score to estimate gestational age.

== Early life ==
Lilly Sebők was born in 1930 in Budapest, the daughter of Hedwig and Julius Sebők. Her father was a Jewish textile worker; he was sent to a Nazi labour camp during the Second World War while Lilly and her mother spent the war in hiding, using falsified papers from the Swedish embassy. In 1948, Lilly and her mother migrated to Australia, where they joined her mother's family. She began working as a waitress and in a biochemistry laboratory while studying medicine part-time at the University of Melbourne, graduating in 1956.

== Medical career ==
In 1958, Sebők moved to London to take up a postgraduate position in endocrinology at Hammersmith Hospital. She met the South African-born neurologist Victor Dubowitz on Easter 1960; they were engaged two weeks later and married within three months. Soon afterwards, husband and wife moved to Sheffield, where Lilly took up a temporary registrar post in paediatrics and discovered a strong interest in neonatology, the study of newborns. She began working on newborn research at night while caring for her own four young children during the day. She and Victor collaborated on the development of a tool to estimate the gestational age of a newborn by examining its neurological signs as well as anatomical features. The test, titled the Dubowitz Score, was published in 1970 and was rapidly adopted around the world for distinguishing mature but malnourished babies from premature babies who were appropriately small for their age. In the United States, to perform the test was known as "Dubowitzing the baby".

Lilly and Victor Dubowitz returned to London's Hammersmith Hospital in 1972, where Lilly pioneered the use of cranial ultrasound and, later, magnetic resonance imaging to assess the brains of newborns. In 1980, husband and wife collaborated again to develop a systematic method for the neurological examination of the newborn. Their assessment paid special attention to premature infants, who at the time were widely felt to be impossible to assess. Lilly Dubowitz continued working at Hammersmith Hospital until her retirement in 1995.

== Later life ==
After her retirement, Dubowitz undertook an extensive investigation of her lost uncle, Stefan Sebők, an architect who had disappeared in Russia during World War II. Her research, which was gathered across three continents and came largely from KGB records, was eventually published in her 2012 book titled In Search of a Forgotten Architect. She died on 14 March 2016.
