= Acyl chloride =

Class of organic compounds

General chemical structure of an acyl chloride

In organic chemistry, an acyl chloride (or acid chloride) is an organic compound with the functional group −C(=O)Cl. Their formula is usually written R−COCl, where R is a side chain. They are reactive derivatives of carboxylic acids (R−C(=O)OH). A specific example of an acyl chloride is acetyl chloride, CH_{3}COCl. Acyl chlorides are the most important subset of acyl halides.

== Nomenclature ==
Where the acyl chloride moiety takes priority, acyl chlorides are named by taking the name of the parent carboxylic acid, and substituting -yl chloride for -ic acid. Thus:

acetic acid (CH_{3}COOH) → acetyl chloride (CH_{3}COCl)
benzoic acid (C_{6}H_{5}COOH) → benzoyl chloride (C_{6}H_{5}COCl)
butyric acid (C_{3}H_{7}COOH) → butyryl chloride (C3H7COCl)

(Idiosyncratically, for some trivial names, -oyl chloride substitutes -ic acid. For example, pivalic acid becomes pivaloyl chloride and acrylic acid becomes acryloyl chloride. The names pivalyl chloride and acrylyl chloride are less commonly used, although they are arguably more logical.)

Acyl chlorides of dicarboxylic acids, called diacyl chlorides (sometimes diacid chlorides or dioyl chlorides), follow similar rules, retaining either their common name or a multiplicative prefix before -yl and chloride.

oxalic acid or ethanedioic acid ((COOH)_{2}) → oxalyl chloride or ethanedioyl dichloride ((COCl)2)
adipic acid or hexanedioic acid (C_{4}H_{8}(COOH)_{2}) → adipoyl chloride or hexanedioyl dichloride (C_{4}H_{8}(COCl)_{2}
phthalic acid or benzene-1,4-dicarboxylic acid (C_{6}H_{4}(COOH)_{2}) → phthaloyl chloride or benzene-1,4-dicarbonyl dichloride (C_{6}H_{4}(COCl)_{2})

When other functional groups take priority, acyl chlorides are considered prefixes — chlorocarbonyl-:

acetic acid (CH_{3}COOH) → (chlorocarbonyl)acetic acid (ClOCCH_{2}COOH)

== Properties ==
Lacking the ability to form hydrogen bonds, acyl chlorides have lower boiling and melting points than similar carboxylic acids. For example, acetic acid boils at 118 °C, whereas acetyl chloride boils at 51 °C. Like most carbonyl compounds, infrared spectroscopy reveals a band near 1750 cm^{−1}.

The simplest stable acyl chloride is acetyl chloride; formyl chloride is not stable at room temperature, although it can be prepared at −60 °C or below.

Acyl chlorides hydrolyze (react with water) to form the corresponding carboxylic acid and hydrochloric acid:

$$\ce{RCOCl  + H2O -> RCOOH + HCl}$$

Structure of 3,5-dinitrobenzoyl chloride with selected bond distances (picometers) and bond angles shown in red.

== Synthesis ==
=== Industrial routes ===
The industrial route to acetyl chloride involves the reaction of acetic anhydride with hydrogen chloride:

$$\ce{(CH3CO)2O + HCl -> CH3COCl + CH3CO2H}$$

Propionyl chloride is produced by chlorination of propionic acid with phosgene:

$$\ce{CH3CH2CO2H + COCl2 -> CH3CH2COCl + HCl + CO2}$$

Benzoyl chloride is produced by the partial hydrolysis of benzotrichloride:

$$\ce{C6H5CCl3 + H2O -> C6H5C(O)Cl + 2 HCl}$$

Similarly, benzotrichlorides react with carboxylic acids to the acid chloride. This conversion is practiced for the reaction of 1,4-bis(trichloromethyl)benzene to give terephthaloyl chloride:

$$\ce{C6H4(CCl3)2  +  C6H4(CO2H)2  ->  2 C6H4(COCl)2 +  2 HCl}$$

=== Laboratory methods ===
==== Thionyl chloride ====
In the laboratory, acyl chlorides are generally prepared by treating carboxylic acids with thionyl chloride (SOCl_{2}). The reaction is catalyzed by dimethylformamide and other additives.

Thionyl chloride is a well-suited reagent as the by-products (HCl, SO_{2}) are gases and residual thionyl chloride can be easily removed as a result of its low boiling point (76 °C).

==== Phosphorus chlorides ====
Phosphorus trichloride (PCl_{3}) is popular, although excess reagent is required. Phosphorus pentachloride (PCl_{5}) is also effective, but only one chloride is transferred:

$$\ce{RCO2H + PCl5  ->  RCOCl + POCl3 + HCl}$$

==== Oxalyl chloride ====
Another method involves the use of oxalyl chloride:

$$\ce{RCO2H + ClCOCOCl ->[DMF]  RCOCl + CO + CO2 + HCl}$$

The reaction is catalysed by dimethylformamide (DMF), which reacts with oxalyl chloride to give the Vilsmeier reagent, an iminium intermediate that which reacts with the carboxylic acid to form a mixed imino-anhydride. This structure undergoes an acyl substitution with the liberated chloride, forming the acid anhydride and releasing regenerated molecule of DMF. Relative to thionyl chloride, oxalyl chloride is more expensive but also a milder reagent and therefore more selective.

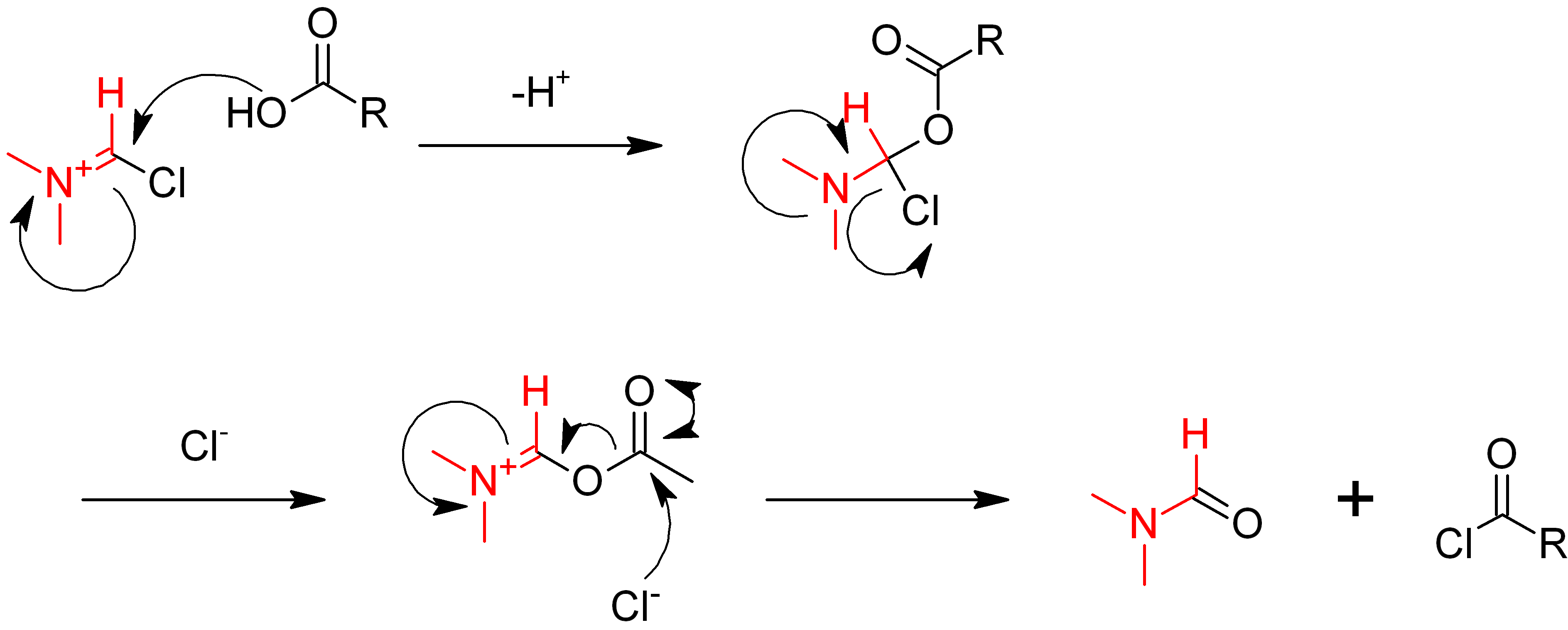

==== Other laboratory methods ====
Acid chlorides can be used as a chloride source. Thus acetyl chloride can be distilled from a mixture of benzoyl chloride and acetic acid:

$$\ce{CH3CO2H + C6H5COCl ->  CH3COCl + C6H5CO2H}$$

Other methods that do not form HCl include the Appel reaction:

$$\ce{RCO2H + Ph3P + CCl4 -> RCOCl + Ph3PO + HCCl3}$$

Another is the use of cyanuric chloride:

$$\ce{RCO2H  + C3N3Cl3  ->  RCOCl  + C3N3Cl2OH}$$

== Reactions ==
Acyl chloride are reactive, versatile reagents. Acyl chlorides have a greater reactivity than other carboxylic acid derivatives like acid anhydrides, esters or amides:

Acyl chlorides hydrolyze, yielding the carboxylic acid:

This hydrolysis is usually a nuisance rather than intentional.

=== Alcoholysis, aminolysis, and related reactions ===
Acid chlorides are useful for the preparation of amides, esters, anhydrides. These reactions generate chloride, which can be undesirable. Acyl chlorides are used to prepare acid anhydrides, amides and esters, by reacting acid chlorides with: a salt of a carboxylic acid, an amine, or an alcohol, respectively.

Acid halides are the most reactive acyl derivatives, and can easily be converted into any of the others. Acid halides will react with carboxylic acids to form anhydrides. If the structure of the acid and the acid chloride are different, the product is a mixed anhydride. First, the carboxylic acid attacks the acid chloride (1) to give tetrahedral intermediate 2. The tetrahedral intermediate collapses, ejecting chloride ion as the leaving group and forming oxonium species 3. Deprotonation gives the mixed anhydride, 4, and an equivalent of HCl.

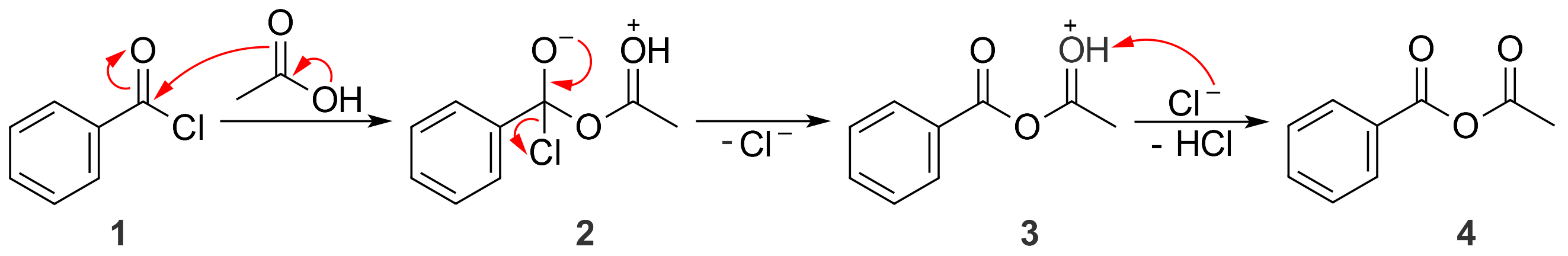

Alcohols and amines react with acid halides to produce esters and amides, respectively, in a reaction formally known as the Schotten-Baumann reaction. Acid halides hydrolyze in the presence of water to produce carboxylic acids, but this type of reaction is rarely useful, since carboxylic acids are typically used to synthesize acid halides. Most reactions with acid halides are carried out in the presence of a non-nucleophilic base, such as pyridine, to neutralize the hydrohalic acid that is formed as a byproduct.

==== Mechanism ====
The alcoholysis of acyl halides (the alkoxy-dehalogenation) is believed to proceed via an S_{N}2 mechanism (Scheme 10). However, the mechanism can also be tetrahedral or S_{N}1 in highly polar solvents (while the S_{N}2 reaction involves a concerted reaction, the tetrahedral addition-elimination pathway involves a discernible intermediate).

Bases, such as pyridine or N,N-dimethylformamide, catalyze acylations. These reagents activate the acyl chloride via a nucleophilic catalysis mechanism. The amine attacks the carbonyl bond and presumably first forms a transient tetrahedral intermediate, then forms a quaternary acylammonium salt by the displacement of the leaving group. This quaternary acylammonium salt is more susceptible to attack by alcohols or other nucleophiles.

The use of two phases (aqueous for amine, organic for acyl chloride) is called the Schotten-Baumann reaction. This approach is used in the preparation of nylon via the so-called nylon rope trick.

=== Reactions with carbanions ===
Acid halides react with carbon nucleophiles, such as Grignards and enolates, although mixtures of products can result. While a carbon nucleophile will react with the acid halide first to produce a ketone, the ketone is also susceptible to nucleophilic attack, and can be converted to a tertiary alcohol. For example, when benzoyl chloride (1) is treated with two equivalents of a Grignard reagent, such as methyl magnesium bromide (MeMgBr), 2-phenyl-2-propanol (3) is obtained in excellent yield. Although acetophenone (2) is an intermediate in this reaction, it is impossible to isolate because it reacts with a second equivalent of MeMgBr rapidly after being formed.

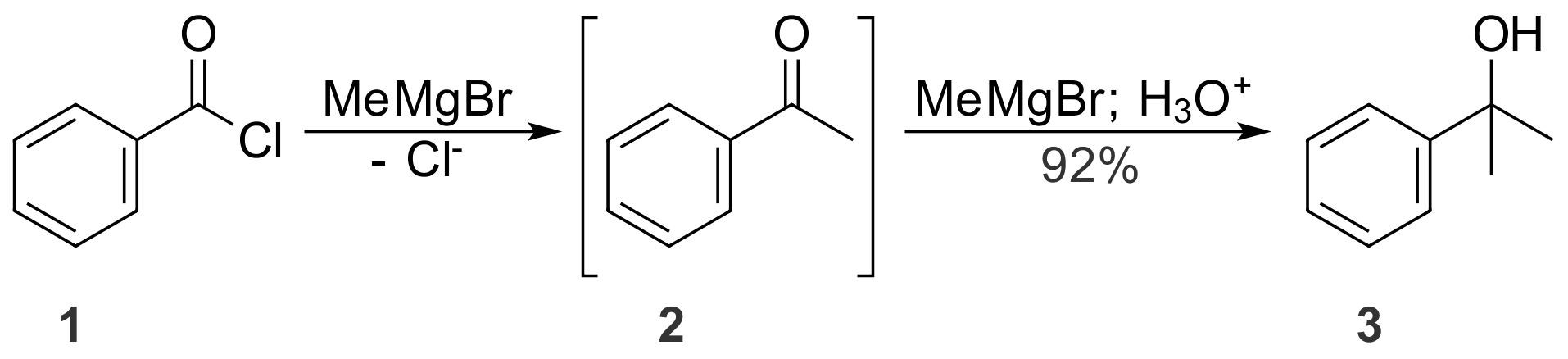

A Weinreb amide.

Unlike most other carbon nucleophiles, lithium dialkylcuprates – often called Gilman reagents – can add to acid halides just once to give ketones. The reaction between an acid halide and a Gilman reagent is not a nucleophilic acyl substitution reaction, however, and is thought to proceed via a radical pathway. The Weinreb ketone synthesis can also be used to convert acid halides to ketones. In this reaction, the acid halide is first converted to an N–methoxy–N–methylamide, known as a Weinreb amide. When a carbon nucleophile – such as a Grignard or organolithium reagent – adds to a Weinreb amide, the metal is chelated by the carbonyl and N–methoxy oxygens, preventing further nucleophilic additions.

Carbon nucleophiles such as Grignard reagents, convert acyl chlorides to ketones, which in turn are susceptible to the attack by second equivalent to yield the tertiary alcohol. The reaction of acyl halides with certain organocadmium reagents stops at the ketone stage. The reaction with Gilman reagents also afford ketones, reflecting the low nucleophilicity of these lithium diorganocopper compounds.

=== Reduction ===
Acyl chlorides are reduced by lithium aluminium hydride and diisobutylaluminium hydride to give primary alcohols. Lithium tri-tert-butoxyaluminium hydride, a bulky hydride donor, reduces acyl chlorides to aldehydes, as does the Rosenmund reduction using hydrogen gas over a poisoned palladium catalyst.

The Rosenmund reduction

=== Acylation of arenes ===
In the Friedel–Crafts acylation, acid halides act as electrophiles for electrophilic aromatic substitution. A Lewis acid – such as zinc chloride (ZnCl_{2}), iron(III) chloride (FeCl_{3}), or aluminum chloride (AlCl_{3}) – coordinates to the halogen on the acid halide, activating the compound towards nucleophilic attack by an activated aromatic ring. For especially electron-rich aromatic rings, the reaction will proceed without a Lewis acid.

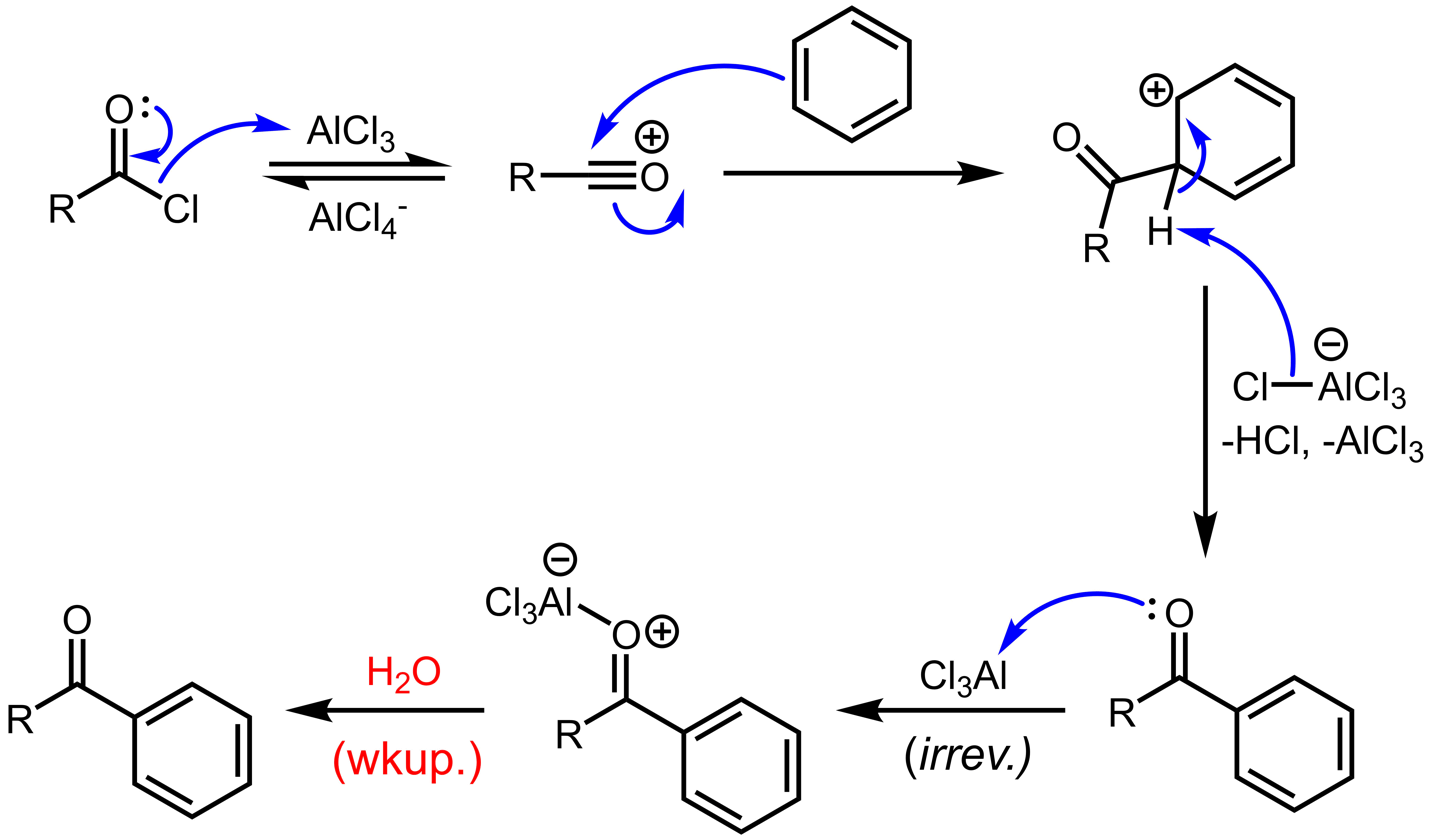

Because of the harsh conditions and the reactivity of the intermediates, this otherwise quite useful reaction tends to be messy, as well as environmentally unfriendly.

=== Oxidative addition ===
Acyl chlorides react with low-valent metal centers to give transition metal acyl complexes. Illustrative is the oxidative addition of acetyl chloride to Vaska's complex, converting square planar Ir(I) to octahedral Ir(III):

$$\ce{IrCl(CO)(PPh3)2  +  CH3COCl  ->  CH3COIrCl2(CO)(PPh3)2}$$

== Hazards ==
Low molecular weight acyl chlorides are often lachrymators, and they react violently with water, alcohols, and amines.
