= Victor Dubowitz =

British neurologist

Professor Victor Dubowitz FRCP
- Born: 6 August 1931 (age 95); Beaufort West, South Africa
- Education: Groote Schuur Hospital; University of Cape Town
- Awards: FRCP
- Scientific career
- Doctoral advisor: Everson Pearse

Victor Dubowitz (born 6 August 1931) is a British neurologist and professor emeritus at Imperial College London. He is principally known along with his wife Lilly Dubowitz for developing two clinical tests, the Dubowitz Score to estimate gestational age and the other for the systematic neurological examination of the newborn.

== Life ==
Dubowitz is the son of Charley Dubowitz and Olga née Schattel. He was educated in Beaufort West Central High School in South Africa. Dubowitz graduated in medicine (MB ChB) from the University of Cape Town in 1954, and moved to the United Kingdom in 1956 to gain some clinical experience, and culture and theatre. Dubowitz planned to return to South Africa after 18 months and return to general practice there, but never did. Sir Francis Fraser of the British Postgraduate Medical Federation found him a post as casualty officer at Lewisham Hospital, where he also stood in as an ophthalmology houseman. He then took a medical post at New End Hospital in Hampstead.

Two medical conditions are named after him, Dubowitz syndrome, a rare genetic disorder characterized by microcephaly, growth retardation and a characteristic facial appearance of unknown genetic cause; and Dubowitz disease, a particular form of spinal muscular atrophy, a severe neuromuscular disorder affecting mainly infants and children.

A medical and research institution at the Great Ormond Street Hospital for Children in London, bears his name (the Dubowitz Neuromuscular Centre).

Dubowitz married Lilly Magdalena Suzanne née Sebők in July 1960, who was also a paediatrician. They had four children, all boys, David born 1963, Michael born 1964, Gerald born 1965, and Daniel born 1969.

== Career ==
Dubowitz started his clinical career in 1954, after graduating in medicine, as a resident in medicine and surgery at Groote Schuur Hospital, for the standard 6 months period in each specialisation. In 1957 he took a three-week locum post at Queen Mary's Hospital for Children in Carshalton, which had two wards of children with muscular dystrophy. He saw his first cases of the disease there and has worked on muscle diseases ever since. Having come for three weeks, he stayed for three years, the first of them as a senior house officer. He took muscle biopsies from the children and studied them in the laboratory of Everson Pearse at Hammersmith Hospital, and then became a lecturer in chemical pathology at the National Hospital for Nervous Diseases, later called National Hospital for Neurology and Neurosurgery, where he handled the muscle biopsies. In 1960 he completed an MD thesis on muscular dystrophy in childhood, submitted to the University of Cape Town, and then took a lectureship at the University of Sheffield, where he stayed for the next 13 years. Ronald Illingworth was Dubowitz's professor at Sheffield. He joined the Department of Child Health at Sheffield as a lecturer in 1961. In 1965 the University of Sheffield awarded him a PhD for his histochemical studies of developing and diseased muscle, carried out with Pearse. He later became reader in Child Health and Developmental Neurology and stayed at Sheffield until 1972. In 1973, Dubowitz applied and received the Chair of Paediatrics and Neonatal Medicine at the Postgraduate Medical School of Hammersmith Hospital, now part of Imperial College London. A large number of researchers followed Dubowitz to the unit, which eventually became the Jerry Lewis Muscle Research Lab, after the building was funded by the Muscular Dystrophy Association. Jerry Lewis opened the unit in person.

Dubowitz was a founding member of the British Paediatric Neurology Association and its president from 1992 to 1995.

In 1996, Dubowitz was made professor emeritus of paediatrics at the University of London. He was the first president of the European Paediatric Neurology Society and the founding editor of the European Journal of Paediatric Neurology, and the society made him an honorary member in 2005. He founded the journal Neuromuscular Disorders in 1990 and became its editor-in-chief. His memoir, Ramblings of a Peripatetic Paediatrician, was published in 2005. Dubowitz was president of the Medical Art Society from 1997 to 2000. From 1972 until his retirement in 1996, Dubowitz led the muscle research unit at Hammersmith Hospital. From 1999 to 2003 Dubowitz was president and later an honorary member of the European Neuromuscular Centre in the Netherlands. From 1972 to the present, Dubowitz has been an honorary consultant paediatrician at the Hammersmith Hospital.

== Dubowitz syndrome ==
The syndrome that eventually became the Dubowitz syndrome was first described in 1965. In Sheffield Dubowitz ran a large clinic for children with cystic fibrosis. He also saw a baby girl born at full term at Jessop Hospital who weighed around 3 to 4lbs. Dubowitz commented that the baby had an unusually shaped face, recessive and it’s an unusual face, with odd ears and a particular nose, and doesn’t quite fit in and the mother commented that her previous child had a similar shaped face. Dubowitz looked through the known syndromes of dwarfism and found that none fully matched. He wrote a case report, published in the Journal of Medical Genetics in 1965. Then geneticist, John M. Opitz, noticed a similar case in a baby girl in Germany, and published an identical case. Opitz stated that they had identical features, and could almost be sister. From that point on the condition eventually became the Dubowitz syndrome.

== World Muscle Society ==
The idea for the World Muscle Society began in early 1995, when Dubowitz discussed the formation of a new society with Luciano Merlini of Bologna, principally due to the quickening of medical advances in the field and it was felt that the interval between the 4-year meetings of the World Federation of Neurology was too long. Dubowitz felt that a new multidisciplinary society was needed that would meet frequently and focus more on the current research community rather than established figures in the medical community. On 6 March 1995 he met Merlini and Giovanni Nigro of Naples in Bologna to plan the society. They took as a model the Mediterranean Society of Myology, which brought together the regional meetings of Nigro in Naples and George Serratrice in Marseille.

The name World Muscle Society was finally chosen as it was the most easily recognisable name. The society was legally established in London. Dubowitz wrote to 60 potential members asking the following two questions:

do you think there is a need a for a new international muscle society to arrange more frequent interdisciplinary meetings; and would you be able to attend a foundation meeting of the new society in London on Sunday 4th June, 1995?

All but two supported the idea, and 15 people attended the foundation meeting in London on Sunday 4 June 1995, where Dubowitz was elected president.

== Awards ==
- 1980 — Commander of the Order of Constantine the Great
- 1982 — Arvo Ylppö Gold Medal, Finland.
- 1987 — Jean Hunter Prize of the Royal College of Physicians.
- 1991 — Gaetano Conte Gold Medal, Italy.
- 1997 — Cornelia de Lange Medal, The Netherlands.
- 2007 — James Spence Gold Medal, Royal College of Paediatrics and Child Health
- 2009 — Inaugural Gold Medal, Jennifer Trust for Spinal Muscular Atrophy
- 2011 — Peter Emil Becker Prize, German Paediatric Neurology Society.
