= Dubowitz Score =

Method for estimating the gestational age of babies

The Dubowitz Score is a method for estimating the gestational age of babies. It was devised by Lilly Dubowitz, a Hungarian-born British paediatrician, and her husband, the British neurologist Victor Dubowitz.
