= C4H6O2 =

The molecular formula C_{4}H_{6}O_{2} may refer to:

- Butenoic acids
  - But-3-enoic acid
  - Crotonic acid
  - Isocrotonic acid
- 1,4-Butynediol
- Butyrolactones
  - β-Butyrolactone
  - γ-Butyrolactone
- Diacetyl, or butanedione
- Diepoxybutane
- 1,4-Dioxene
- Formyl acetone, technically CH_{3}(C=O)CH_{2}CHO, but it only exists as a salt of the enol, sodium formyl acetone.
- Methacrylic acid
- Methyl acrylate
- Succinaldehyde
- Vinyl acetate
