= C4H7Cl =

The molecular formula C_{4}H_{7}Cl (molar mass: 90.55 g/mol, exact mass: 90.0236 u) may refer to:

- Crotyl chloride
- Methallyl chloride
