= Ene-reductase =

Class of enzymes

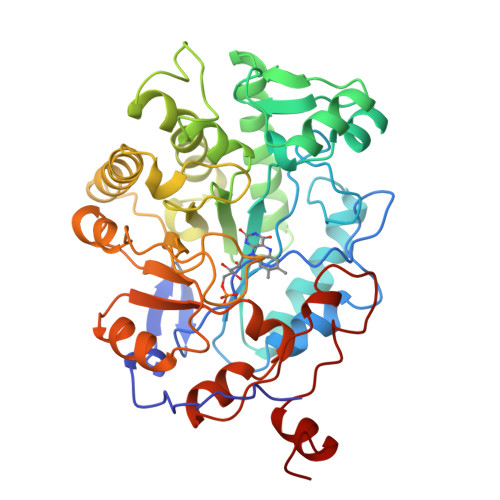
Old yellow enzyme (OYE1) double mutant H191N N194H (a type of ER)

Ene-reductase (ER, ERED) is an enzyme able to catalyze the stereoselective reduction of carbon-carbon double bonds (C=C) that are activated by electron withdrawing groups (EWG), like aldehydes, ketones and esters. The catalytic cycle is dependent from the cofactor nicotinamide adenine dinucleotide phosphate (NADPH). Unlike traditional stereoselective chemical hydrogenation, that often uses noble metals and harsh conditions, ERs can operate under mild and aqueous conditions and their stereoselectivity depends on the specific enzyme.

== Classification ==
Ene-reductases are classified as oxidoreductases (EC 1), they can be divided in two broad categories based on the performed reduction mechanism:

- Flavin-dependent enzymes.
- Flavin-independent enzymes.

Both classes require, for "natural" reactions, catalytic amounts of NAD(P)H as a reducing cofactor that is often regenerated in situ.

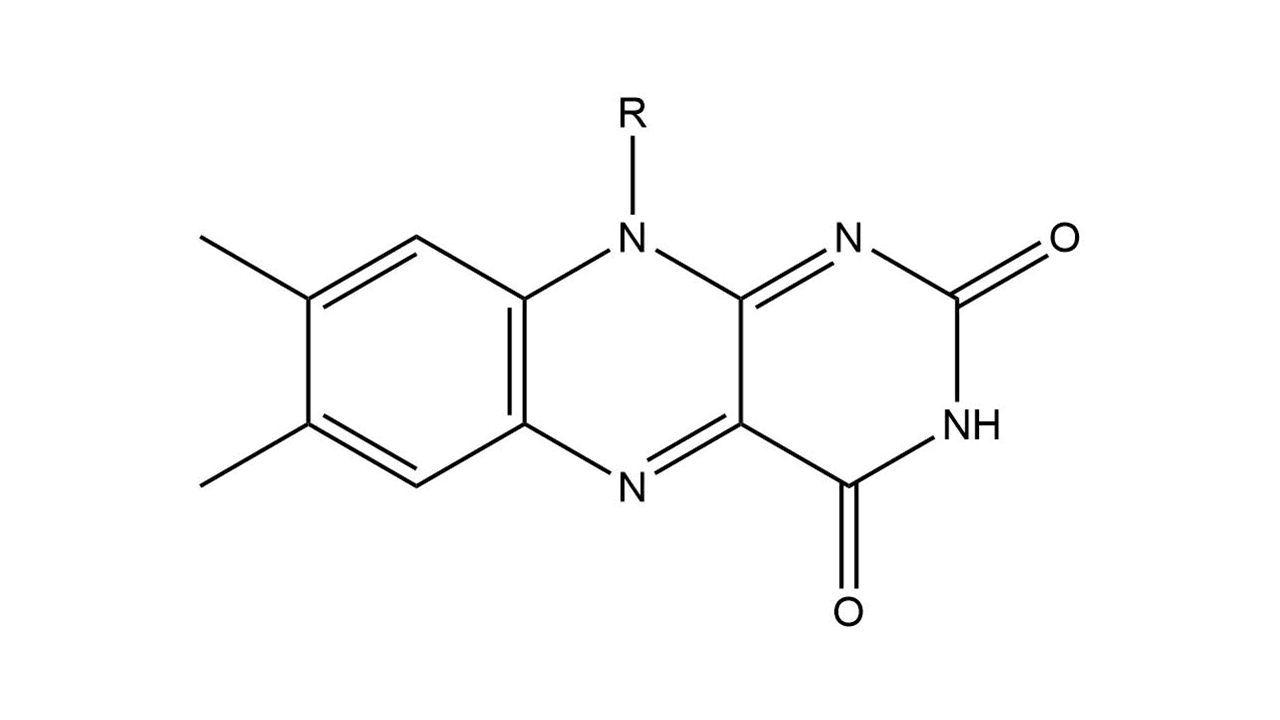
Flavin with R group

=== Flavin-dependent ene-reductases ===
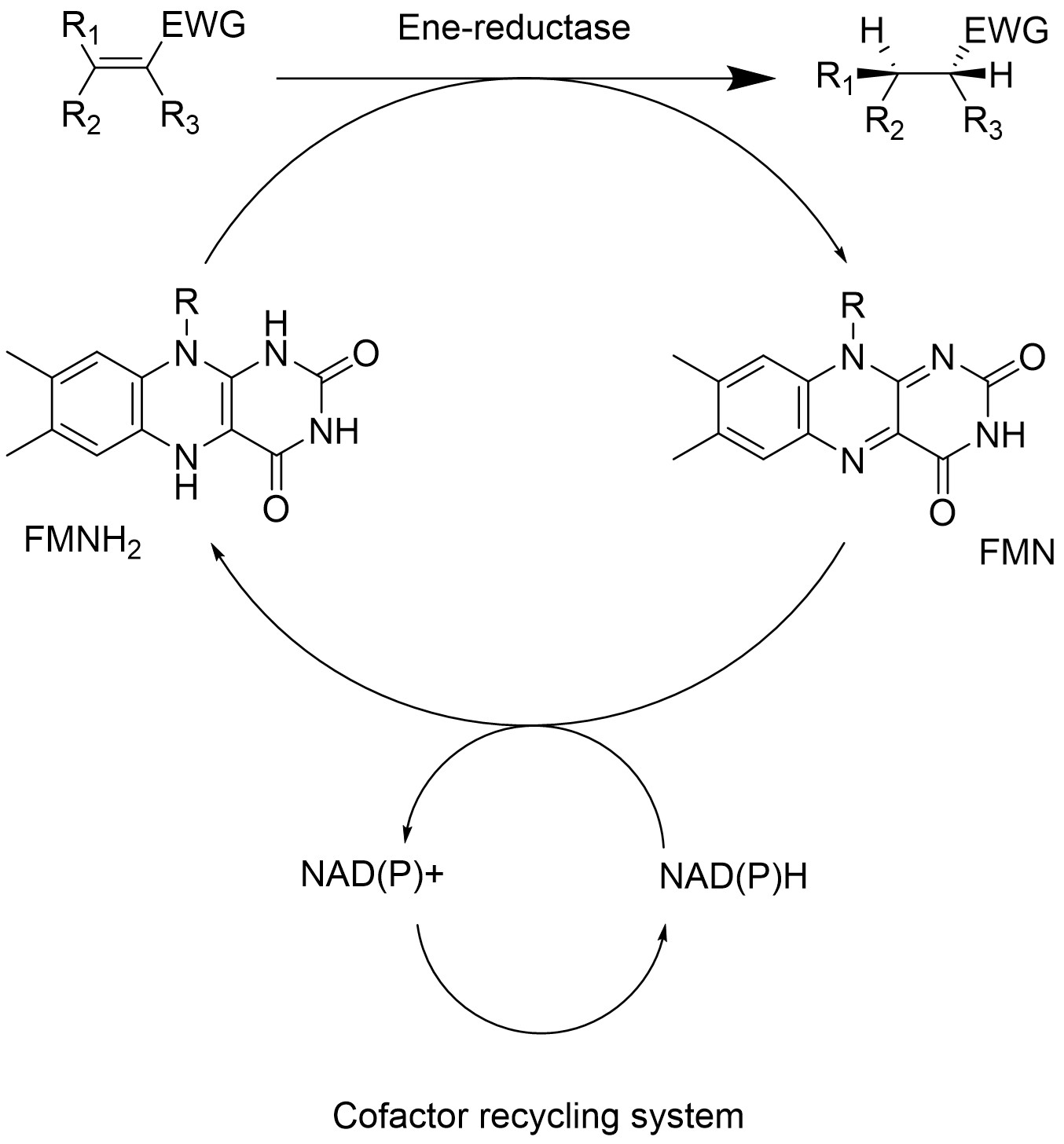
Flavin-dependent ene-reductase reaction

Flavin-dependent ERs perform their reactions using the cofactor flavin mononucleotide (FMN) that is non-covalently bonded to the enzyme and their catalytic mechanism is now well understood.

In the natural cycle, the cofactor (FMN) is first reduced by NAD(P)H, then the reduced FMNH2 reduces the substrate by Michael-type hydride transfer to the β-carbon atom. In the end the protonation of the resulting anion occurs from the opposite face of the (C=C) bond through a tyrosine moiety or solvent. The overall reaction is an anti-trans-hydrogenation. This catalytic mechanism can also be regenerated from the natural nicotinamide cofactor with a substrate-coupled regeneration or the use of synthetic reductants and electrochemical or photochemical regeneration.

The most predominant family of flavin-dependent ERs is the Old Yellow Enzyme (OYE) family of oxidoreductases (EC 1.6.99.1).The first OYE was discovered in baker's yeast (Saccharomyces cerevisiae) in 1933, and its name derives from the color it assumes when concentrated, which is due to the flavin cofactor. They catalyze the reduction of α,β-unsaturated compounds, with a high specificity for activating groups containing aldehydes, ketones, or nitro groups. Conversely, carboxylic acids and their derivatives such as esters and nitriles, are less activated and are considered as "borderline substrates".

Another family of flavin-dependent ERs, that is specialized for substrates containing carboxylic acids and esters, are the oxygen-sensitive enoate reductases (EnoR; EC 1.3.1.31) that contain flavin adenine dinucleotide (FAD) and the [4Fe−4S] prosthetic group.

=== Flavin-independent ene-reductases ===
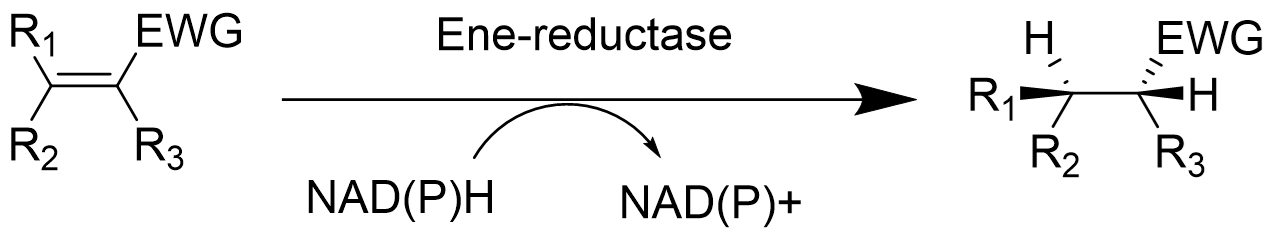
Flavin-independent ene-reductases reaction

Flavin-independent ERs are able to reduce their substrates directly using the NAD(P)H cofactor that can be regenerated. Two families of this group are the medium-chain dehydrogenases/reductases (MDR; EC 1.3.1), and the short-chain dehydrogenases/reductases (SDR; EC 1.1.1.207−8).

The typical substrates reduced by those enzymes include aromatic and monocyclic alkenes containing aldehydes or ketones as activating groups.

== Application in fine chemicals synthesis ==
There are some examples of fine chemicals production using synthetic biology approaches in which ERs are used to catalyze one of the biocatalytic steps:

- The aromatic acids 3-phenylpropionic acid (3PPA) and 3-(4-hydroxyphenyl)propionic acid (HPPA) are important commodities used in the chemical, pharmaceutical, and food industrial sectors. A biosynthetic route to synthetize these compounds was designed by combining the Escherichia coli phenylalanine pathway with non-native enzymes like tyrosine ammonia lyase (TAL) and the clostridial EnoR. The full pathway was assembled in Escherichia coli, which led to the production of HPPA and cinnamyl alcohol. Optimization of individual enzyme expression levels produced 3PPA and HPPA with a concentration of 367 and 225 mg/L, in this case the oxygen-sensitive EnoRs were catalytically active under the microaerophilic fermentation conditions.
- The 2-methylsuccinic acid (2-MSA) is used to synthetize polymers that have application as bioplastics, cosmetic solvents and coatings. A pathway for its synthesis was designed using Escherichia coli, combining native pyruvate and acetyl-CoA biosynthesis with methanogenic citramalate synthase (CimA), isopropylmalate isomerase (LeuCD), and the ER YqjM or KpnER from Klebsiella pneumoniae. The successful production of 2-MSA was achieved with a concentration of 0.96 g/L using KpnER.

== Ene-reductases: enzymatic promiscuity ==
In recent studies, flavin-dependent ERs have demonstrated a remarkable catalytic promiscuity, in particular in photo-ene-reductases catalysis. The non-natural reactions that can be performed can be divided in hydride-dependent and hydride-independent reactions:

- Hydride-dependent reactions: in nature the ERs promote an hydride attack on the β-carbon of an activated (C═C) bond modifying its electronic density. This catalytic ability promotes the reduction of other functional groups of a variety of non-natural substrates, including the hydrogenation of nitro groups, activated oximes, activated alkynes, and α,β-dicarbonyls, as well as the desaturation of α,β-saturated carbonyl compounds.
- Hydride-independent reactions: ERs can catalyze reactions relying on an external source of electrons to reduce the flavin cofactor, thereby initiating the reaction cycle. Otherwise, a desaturation reaction can rely on substrate reduction of flavin to promote the catalytic cycle. However not all the hydride-independent reactions mechanistically depend on the flavin cofactor or the involvement of the hydride transfer process. Some examples of these reactions are the (C═C) bond isomerization, Knoevenagel condensation, Morita–Baylis–Hillman reaction, and radical reactions.

== See also ==
- Biocatalysis
- Biosynthesis
- Protein engineering
