= Group transfer reaction =

Reaction in organic chemistry

In organic chemistry, a group transfer reaction is a class of the pericyclic reaction where one or more groups of atoms is transferred from one molecule to another. Group transfer reactions can sometimes be difficult to identify when separate reactant molecules combine into a single product molecule (like in the ene reaction). Unlike other pericyclic reaction classes, group transfer reactions do not have a specific conversion of pi bonds into sigma bonds or vice versa, and tend to be less frequently encountered. Like all pericyclic reactions, group transfer reactions must obey the Woodward–Hoffmann rules. Group transfer reactions can be divided into two distinct subcategories: the ene reaction and the diimide reduction. Group transfer reactions have diverse applications in various fields, including protein adenylation, biocatalytic and chemoenzymatic approaches for chemical synthesis, and strengthening skim natural rubber latex.

== Mechanism ==
A defining feature of the group transfer reaction is that it is a concerted reaction, in which a bond is broken and formed in one step. The concerted reaction occurs due to the orbital overlap between the alkene and the allylic enophile. The electrons in the highest occupied molecular orbital (HOMO) of the ene are transferred to the lowest occupied molecular orbital (LUMO) of the enophile.

Figure 1. The mechanism of the group transfer reaction is allowed by the orbital overlap of the HOMO of the ene and the LUMO of the enophile.

== Sub-categories of Group Transfer Reactions ==
=== Ene Reaction ===
The ene reaction is one of the most common forms of group transfer reactions, where an allylic hydrogen is transferred to an alkene in a cyclic concerted mechanism. The ene reaction is further divided into subgroups including intramolecular ene, metallo-ene, and carbonyl ene reactions. The reverse reaction, commonly called the retro-ene reaction, can occur under high temperatures.

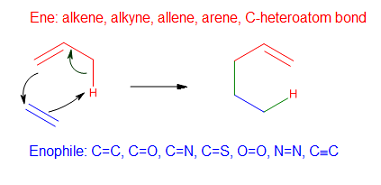
Figure 2. Generic ene reaction.

=== Reductions with Diimide ===
Reductions with diimide is another class of group transfer reactions, in which alkenes and alkynes are reduced concertedly with diimide as the reducing agent. In the generic mechanism of a reduction with diimide (Figure 3), nitrogen gas is lost as a result. The diimide reduction displays a higher selectivity for the symmetrical homonuclear C=C double bond compared to the heteronuclear C=O double bond. Along with a preference for reducing the least conjugated double bond, showcasing the precision of reductions with diimides in targeted organic synthesis.

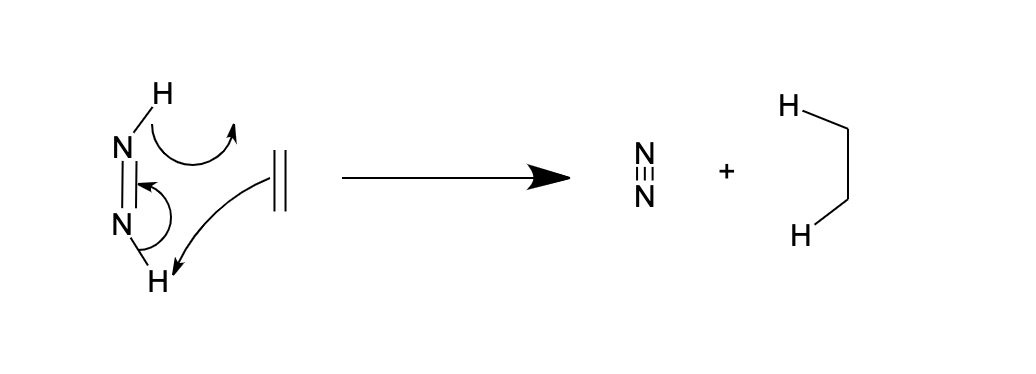
Figure 3. Generic mechanism of a reduction with diimide adapted from Mandal.

== Applications of Group Transfer Reactions ==
=== Protein Adenylylation ===
Group transfer reactions are prevalent in many biological mechanisms. One example is protein adenylylation, where adenosine triphosphate (ATP) transfers an adenosine monophosphate group to another protein at threonine or tyrosine residues. Adenylylation protein modification adds a negative charge to the protein and thus changes its protein function. Protein adenylylation is especially documented in bacterial modification of GTPases, since this modification of GTPases via adenylylation prevents the host cell's ability to prevent infection.

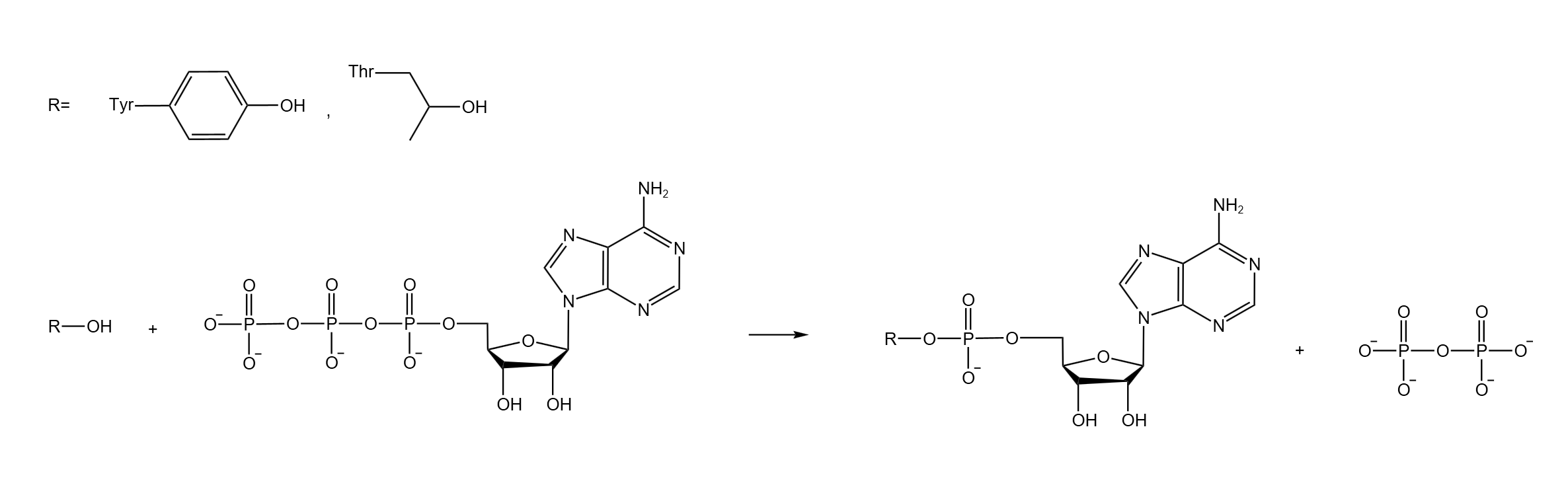
Figure 4. Scheme of protein adenylylation of threonine and tyrosine side chains, a biological application of group transfer reactions. This figure is adapted from Hedberg and Itzen.

=== Biocatalytic and Chemoenzymatic Approaches for Chemical Synthesis ===
The application of the ene reduction can be observed in both biocatalytic and chemoenzymatic approaches for chemical synthesis. The capacity of ene reduction to catalyze diverse reactions with high selectivity renders it a valuable tool in the synthesis of complex and stereospecific compounds. Ene reduction plays a role in the production of fine chemicals, pharmaceutical compounds, agrochemicals, and biofuels. Highlighting the functionality of ene reductases emphasizes their crucial role in catalyzing a variety of reactions. One example is the ene-reductase Old-Yellow-Enzyme (OYE) which can reduce a carbon-carbon double bond (C=C) with a catalytic amount of NADH.

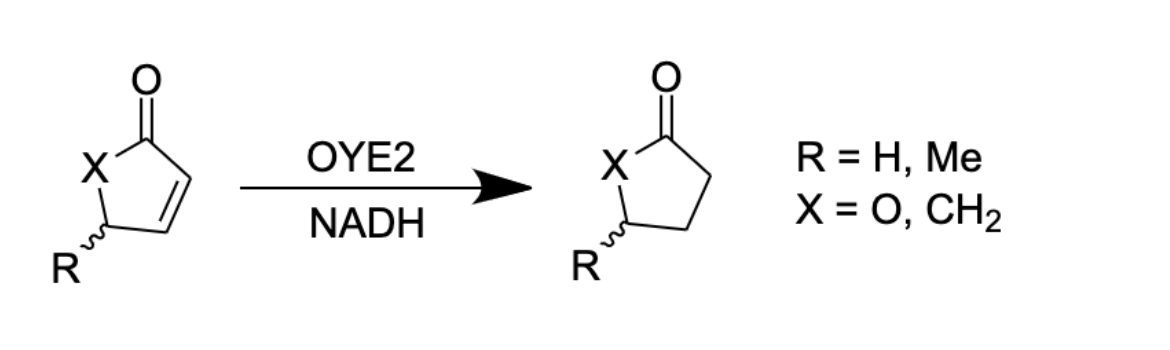
Figure 5. The ene reduction of an alkene using OYE2 ene reductase. This figure is adapted from an article on the Discovery, Characterization, Engineering, and Applications of Ene-Reductases for Industrial Biocatalysis.
