= Butenoic acid =

Isomers of butenoic acid

Crotonic acid

Isocrotonic acid

3-Butenoic acid

Butenoic acid is any of three monocarboxylic acids with an unbranched 4-carbon chain with 3 single bonds and one double bond; that is, with the structural formula HO(O=)C–CH=CH–CH_{2}–H (2-butenoic) or HO(O=)C–CH_{2}–CH=CH–H (3-butenoic). All have the chemical formula C_{3}H_{5}COOH or C_{4}H_{6}O_{2}.

These compounds are technically mono-unsaturated fatty acids, although some authors may exclude them for being too short. The three isomers are:

- crotonic acid (trans-2-butenoic or (2E)-but-2-enoic acid)
- isocrotonic acid (cis-2-butenoic or (2Z)-but-2-enoic acid)
- 3-butenoic acid (but-3-enoic acid).

== See also ==
- Methacrylic acid, also C_{3}H_{5}COOH but branched like isobutene; a.k.a. isobutenoic acid
- Butyric acid, C_{3}H_{7}COOH; a.k.a. butanoic acid
- Butenedioic acid
