= Vinylogy =

Transmission of electronic effects through a system of conjugated chemical bonds

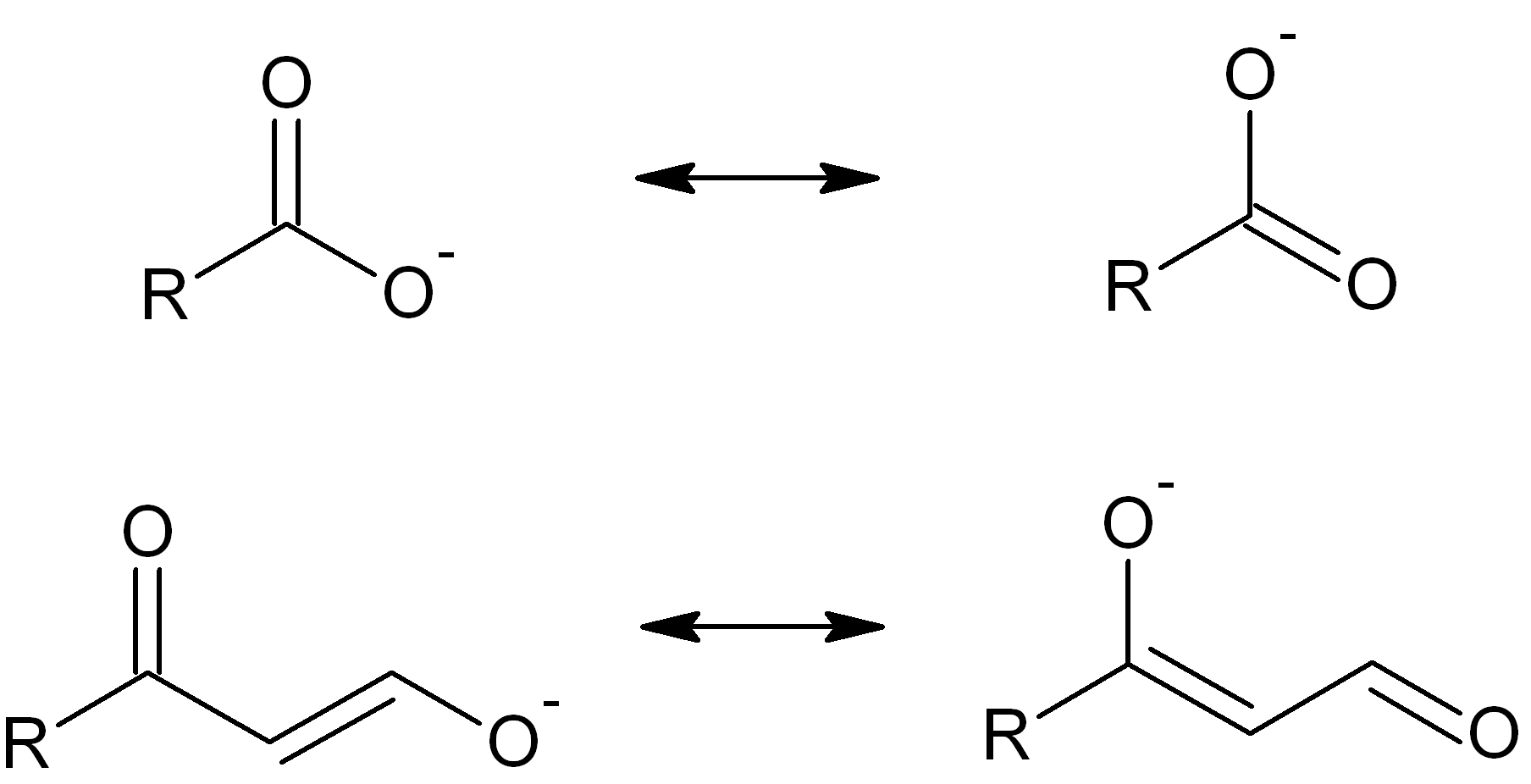
Delocalization of negative charge in a generic carboxylate anion, derived from an organic carboxylic acid (cf. acetic acid), and the corresponding vinylogous carboxylate anion (the "vinylog/vinylogue" of the carboxylate anion), where a vinyl group now separates the charged oxygen from the carbonyl (C=O) group. The validity of the theoretical concept of vinylogy is supported by the pKa of such vinylogs, which approach that of the analogous carboxylic acid.

In organic chemistry, vinylogy is the transmission of electronic effects through a conjugated organic bonding system. The concept was introduced in 1926 by Ludwig Claisen to explain the acidic properties of formylacetone and related ketoaldehydes. Formylacetone, technically CH_{3}(C=O)CH_{2}CH=O, only exists in the ionized form CH_{3}(C−O^{−})=CH−CH=O or CH_{3}(C=O)−CH=CH−O^{−}. Its adjectival form, vinylogous, is used to describe functional groups in which the standard moieties of the group are separated by a carbon–carbon double bond.

For example, a carboxylic acid is defined as a carbonyl group (C=O) directly attached to a hydroxyl group (OH): O=C–OH. A vinylogous carboxylic acid has a vinyl unit (−HC=CH−, vinylene) between the two groups that define the acid: O=C–C=C–OH. The usual resonance of a carboxylate can propagate through the alkene of a vinylogous carboxylate. Likewise, 3-dimethylaminoacrolein is the vinylogous-amide analog of dimethylformamide.

Due to the transmission of electronic information through conjugation, vinylogous functional groups often possess "analogous" reactivity or chemical properties compared to the parent functional group. Hence, vinylogy is a useful heuristic for the prediction of the behavior of systems that are structurally similar but contain intervening C=C bonds that are conjugated to the attached functional groups. For example, a key property of carboxylic acids is their Brønsted acidity. The simplest carboxylic acid, formic acid (HC(=O)−OH), is a moderately strong organic acid with a pK_{a} of 3.7. We would expect vinylogous carboxylic acids to have similar acidity. Indeed, the vinylog of formic acid, 2-formyl-1-ethen-1-ol, HC(=O)−CH=CH−OH has a substantial Brønsted acidity, with an estimated pK_{a} ~ 5–6. In particular, vinylogous carboxylic acids are substantially stronger acids than typical enols (pK_{a} ~ 12). Vitamin C (ascorbic acid, see below) is a biologically important example of a vinylogous carboxylic acid.

The insertion of a o- or p-phenylene (i.e., a benzene ring in the 1,2- or 1,4-orientation) also results in some similarities in reactivity (called phenylogy), although the phenylogous effect is generally weaker, as conjugation through the aryl ring requires consideration of resonance forms or intermediates in which aromaticity is disrupted.

Vinylogous reactions are believed to occur when orbitals of the double bonds of the vinyl group and of an attached electron-withdrawing group (EWG; the π orbitals) are aligned and so can overlap and mix (i.e., are conjugated). Electron delocalization enables the EWG to receive electron density through participation of the conjugated system.

== Vinylogous reactivity ==
A classic example of vinylogy is the relatively high acidity of the γ-hydrogen in CH_{3}CH=CHC(O)R. The acidity of the terminal methyl group is similar to that for the methyl ketone CH_{3}C(O)R.

Vinylogous reactions also include conjugate additions, where a nucleophile reacts at the vinyl terminus, akin to the addition of the nucleophile to the carbonyl of the methyl ketone. In a vinylogous variation of the aldol reaction, an electrophile is attacked by a nucleophilic vinylogous enolate (see first and following image). The vinylogous enolate reacts at the terminal position of the double bond system (the γ-carbon), rather than the α-carbon immediately adjacent to the carbonyl, as would a simple enolate. Allylic electrophiles often react by vinylogous attack of a nucleophile rather than direct addition.

Vinylogous aldol reaction. Cf. the simple aldol reaction.

A further example of vinylogous reactivity: ascorbic acid (Vitamin C) behaves as a vinylogous carboxylic acid by involvement of its carbonyl moiety, a vinyl group within the ring, and the lone pair on the hydroxyl group acting as the conjugated system. Acidity of the hydroxyl proton at the terminus of the vinyl group in ascorbic acid is more comparable to a typical carboxylic acid than an alcohol because two major resonance structures stabilize the negative charge on the conjugate base of ascorbic acid (center and right structures in last image), analogous to the two resonance structures that stabilize the negative charge on the anion that results from removal of a proton from a simple carboxylic acid (cf. first image).

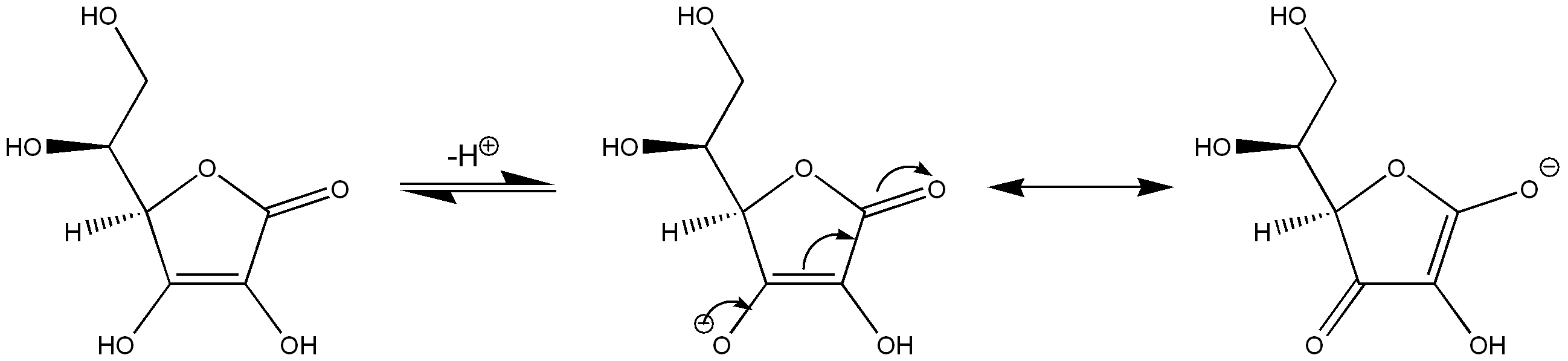
Electron pushing for major resonance structures in conjugate base of ascorbic acid
