= Cobalt(II)–porphyrin catalysis =

Cobalt(II)–porphyrin catalysis is a process in which a Co(II) porphyrin complex acts as a catalyst, inducing and accelerating a chemical reaction.

It is a compound in organic chemistry and free radical reactions that can involve homolysis. It is a one-electron catalytic approach for homolytic radical chemistry based on structurally well-defined Co(II) complexes. Due to their distinctive radical mechanisms that involve metal-stabilized radical intermediates, such as α-metalloalkyl radicals, α-metalloaminyl radicals, and α-metalloxyl radicals, the Co(II)–porphyrin-based catalysis system addresses some long-standing challenges in organic transformations.

A family of unique D2-symmetric chiral porphyrins are effective in a range of stereodefined transformations.

== Attributes ==
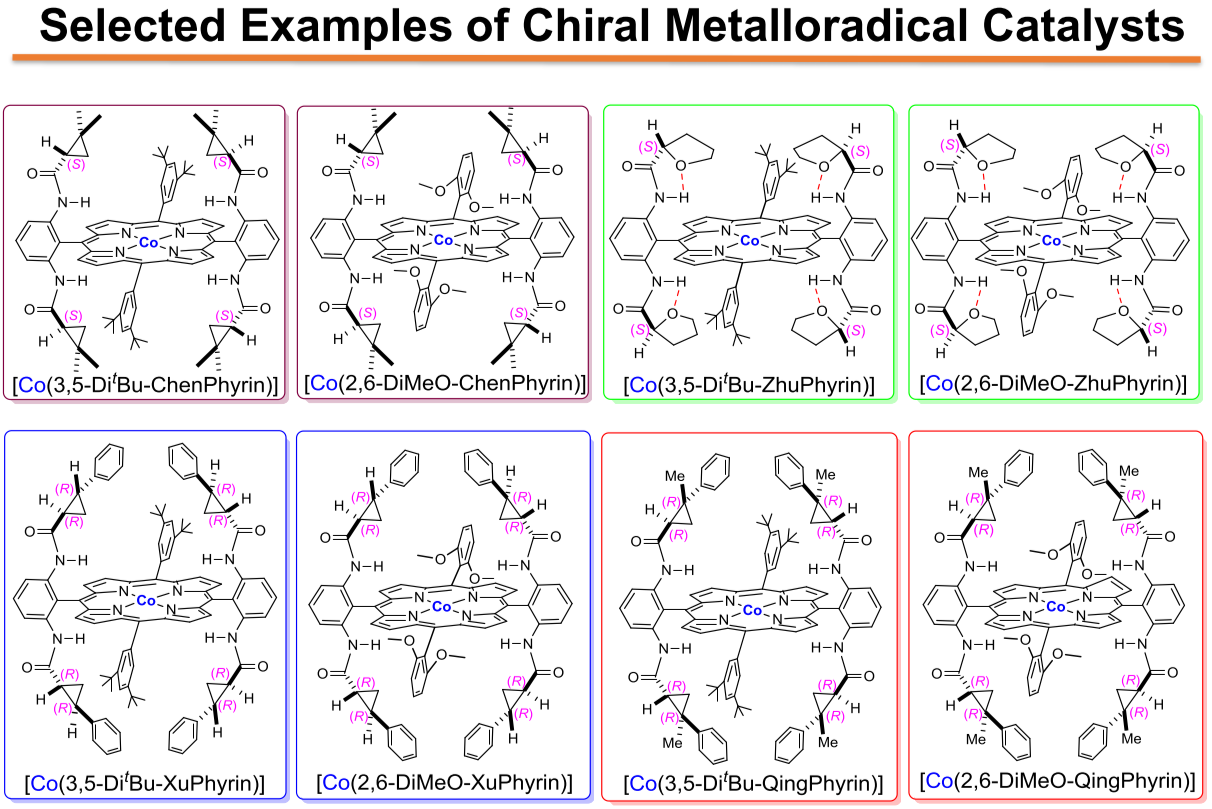

Co(II)–porphyrin catalysts have good thermal and metal coordination stability resulting from the macrocyclic chelation effect of the aromatic ligand. Once inserted into the macrocyclic ring, dissociation of the metal ion is exceedingly difficult, under most reaction conditions, leading to increased catalyst lifetime . Metal ion contamination is a practical issue for many metal-catalyzed processes, and is especially important for pharmaceutical application.

Co(II)–porphyrin catalysts lack vacant cis-coordination sites available (all occupied). This unique metal coordination mode can prevent a number of possible side reactions associated with cis-coordination, and results in a more effective and selective catalytic process. Although cis-coordination is requisite for many catalytic processes, it is not required for catalytic cyclopropanation or aziridination, or for atom or group transfer reactions.

Third, it has been well documented that the physical and chemical properties of a porphyrin complex of a given metal ion can be systematically tuned by introducing peripheral substituents with varied electronic, steric, and conformational environments on the aromatic ring structure of the porphyrin ligand. X. Peter Zhang's group have accomplished porphyrin modification by using palladium-catalyzed coupling processes of chiral amides on bromoporphyrin templates.

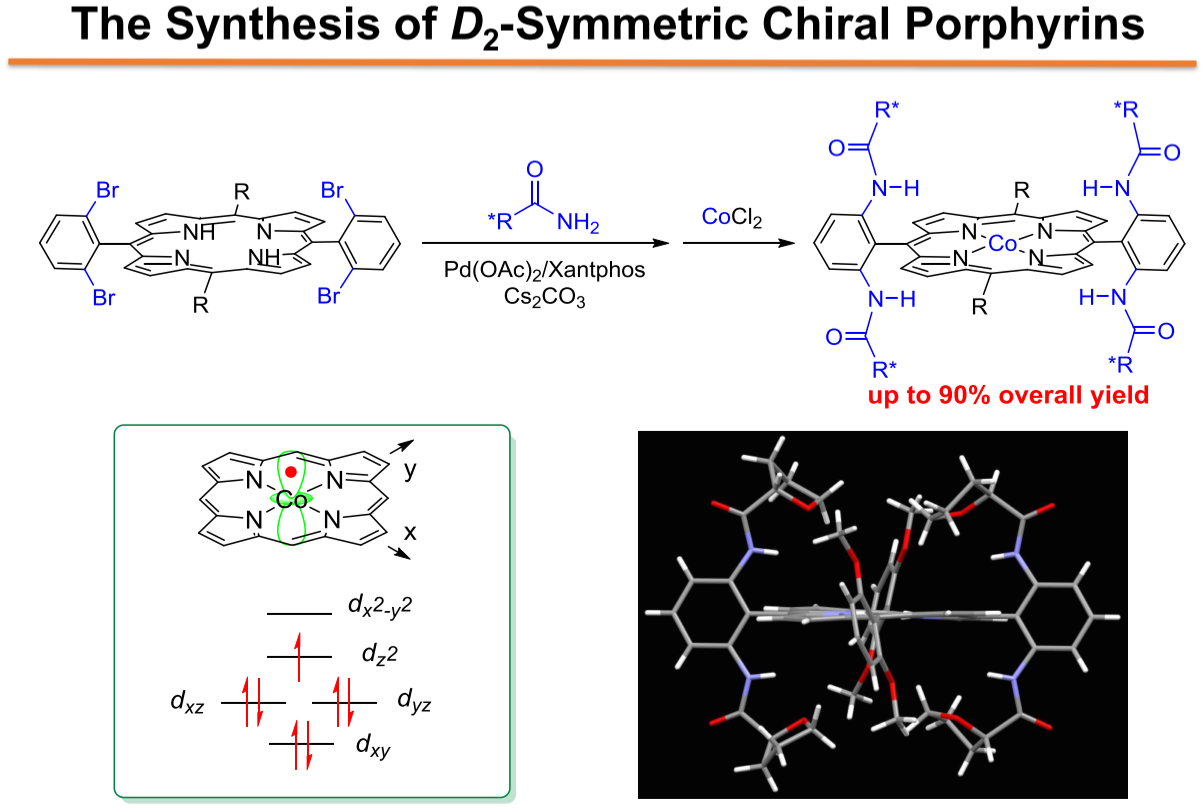

Together, these advantages provide Co(II)–porphyrin catalysts with high catalytic selectivities and turnover numbers.

=== Application ===
Radical carbenes such as Co–porphyrin catalysis activate diazo reagents and organic azides to generate C- and N-centered radicals, respectively, with nitrogen as the only byproduct in a controlled and catalytic manner. The initially formed C- and N-centered radicals can undergo common radical reactions such as radical addition and atom abstraction, but with effective control of reactivity and stereoselectivity by the porphyrin ligand environment.

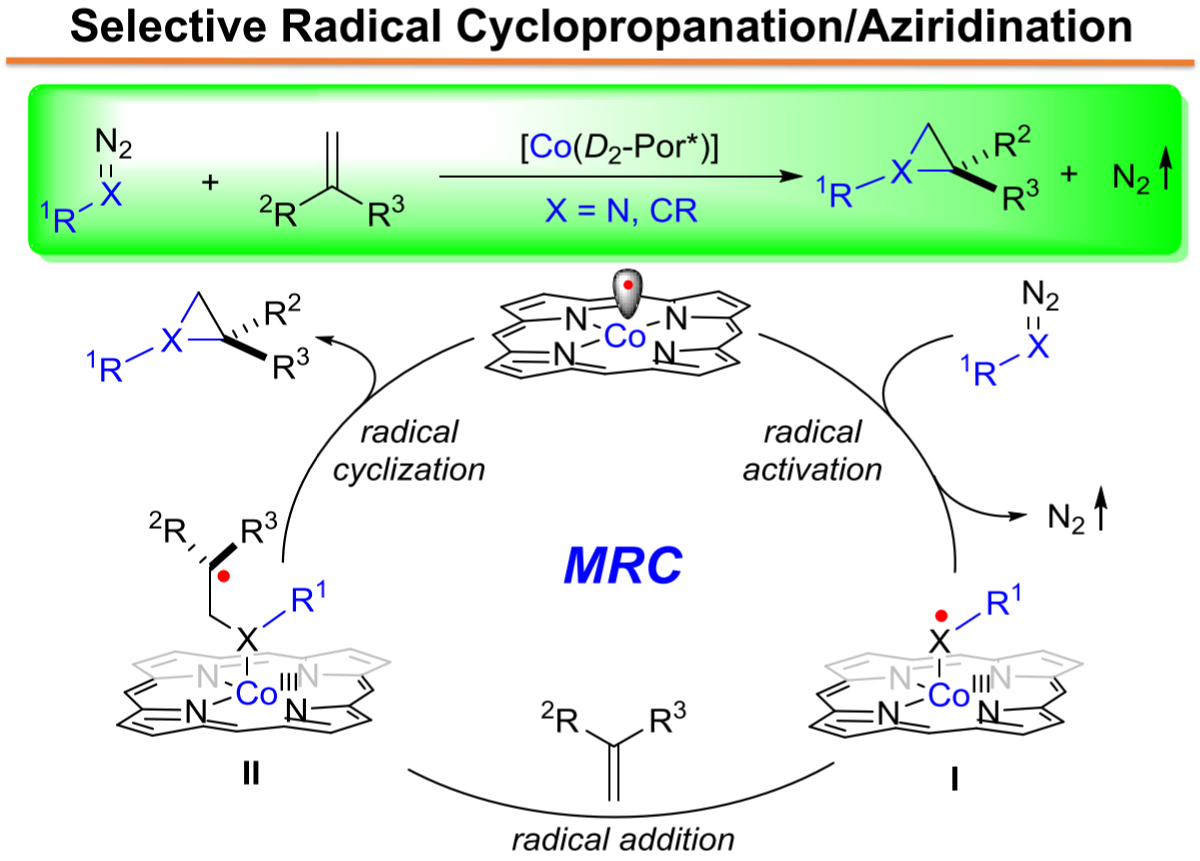

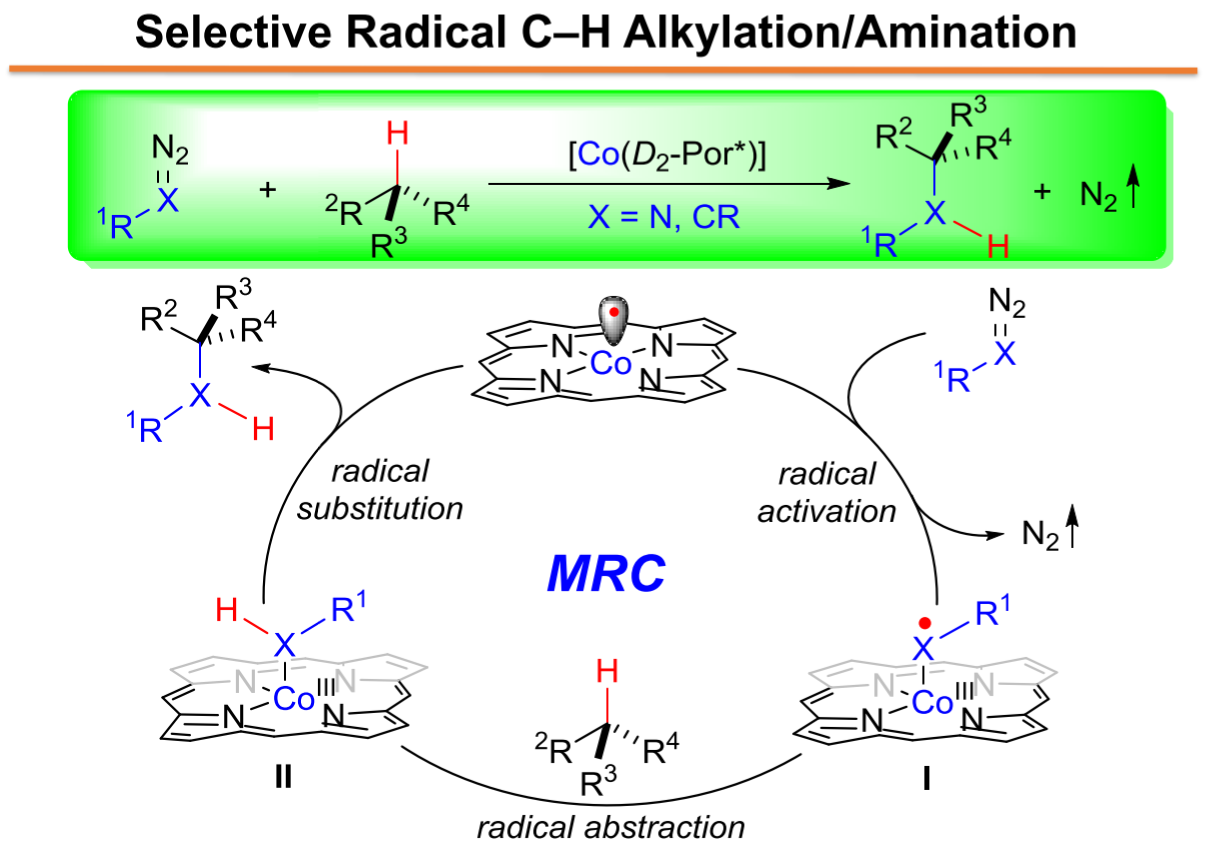
