= Isocrotonic acid =

- Skeletal formula

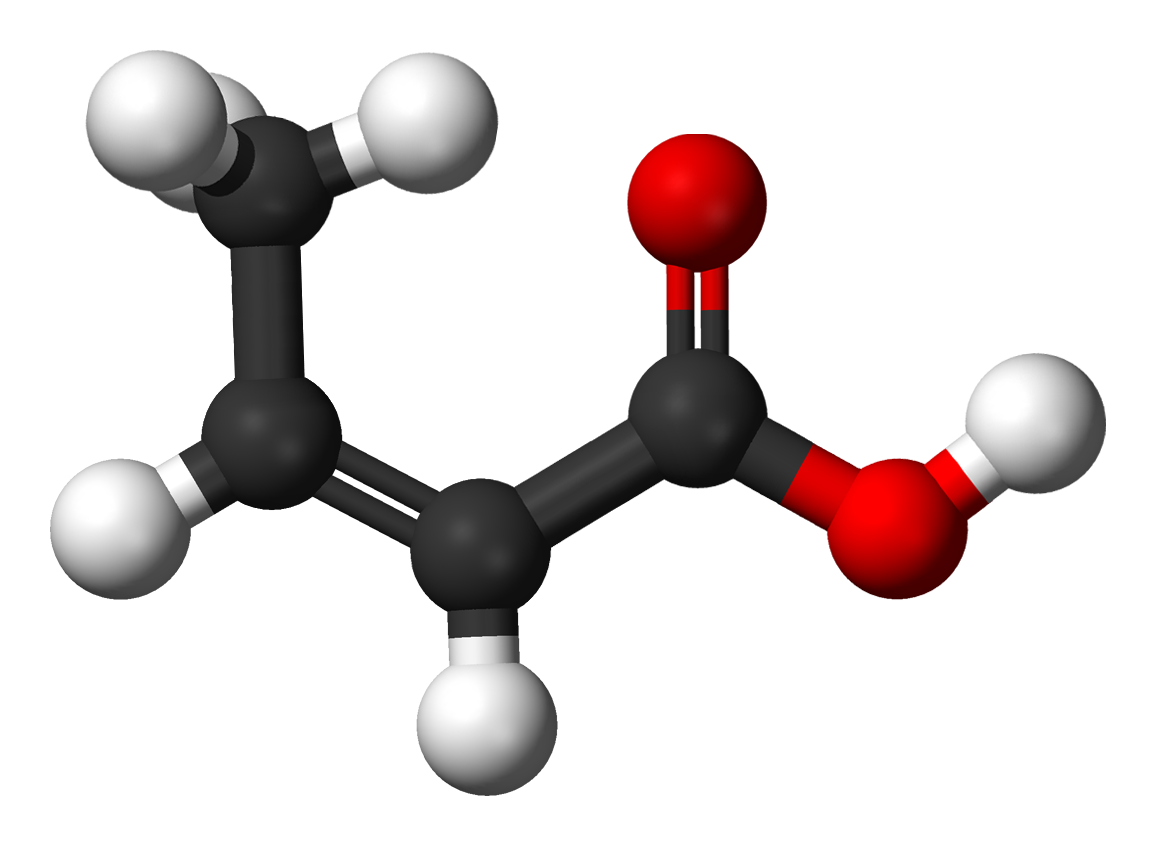
- Ball-and-stick model

Names
- Preferred IUPAC name (2Z)-But-2-enoic acid
- Other names (Z)-But-2-enoic acid (Z)-2-Butenoic acid cis-2-Butenoic acid cis-β-Methylacrylic acid (Z)-β-Methylacrylic acid

Identifiers
CAS Number	503-64-0
3D model (JSmol)	Interactive image
ChEBI	CHEBI:36253
ChemSpider	558890
ECHA InfoCard	100.007.249
EC Number	207-973-2
PubChem CID	643792
UNII	85GQ7GL1UM
CompTox Dashboard (EPA)	DTXSID70880977
- InChI: InChI=1S/C4H6O2/c1-2-3-4(5)6/h2-3H,1H3,(H,5,6)/b3-2- Key: LDHQCZJRKDOVOX-IHWYPQMZSA-N; InChI=1/C4H6O2/c1-2-3-4(5)6/h2-3H,1H3,(H,5,6)/b3-2- Key: LDHQCZJRKDOVOX-IHWYPQMZBE
- SMILES: C/C=C\C(=O)O

Properties
Chemical formula	C_{4}H_{6}O_{2}
Molar mass	86.090 g·mol^{−1}
Density	1.03 g·cm^{−3}
Melting point	12.5 to 14 °C (54.5 to 57.2 °F; 285.6 to 287.1 K)
Boiling point	168 to 169 °C (334 to 336 °F; 441 to 442 K)

Related compounds
Related carboxylic acids	Crotonic acid (trans isomer); Angelic acid 3-Butenoic acid
- Except where otherwise noted, data are given for materials in their standard state (at 25 °C [77 °F], 100 kPa). verify (what is ?) Infobox references

Isocrotonic acid (also known as quartenylic acid; formally named (Z)-2-butenoic acid) is the cis isomer of crotonic acid. It is an oil, possessing an odor similar to that of brown sugar. At its boiling point of 171.9 °C, it converts into crotonic acid. The compound can be prepared from 1,3‑dibromo-2‑butanone via the Favorskii rearrangement.

== Related compounds ==
Ethyl isocrotonate can be prepared by semihydrogenation of ethyl tetrolate.

Rudolph Fittig and Hugo Erdmann showed that the γ-phenyl structural analog of isocrotonic acid forms α-naphthol when dehydrated, an observation that provided useful evidence in understanding the nature of naphthalene.

(Z)-(C_{6}H_{5})CH=CHCH_{2}COOH → α-naphthol + H_{2}O
