= Butyrolactone =

Butyrolactone may refer to:

- beta-Butyrolactone
- gamma-Butyrolactone (GBL)
