= 2-enoate reductase =

Class of enzymes

Identifiers
- EC no.: 1.3.1.31
- CAS no.: 70712-51-5

Databases
- BRENDA: enzyme data
- ExPASy: NiceZyme view
- KEGG: enzyme entry
- MetaCyc: metabolic pathway
- Rhea: reactions
- PDB structures: RCSB PDB PDBe PDBsum
- Gene Ontology: AmiGO / QuickGO
Search
- PMC: articles
- PubMed: articles
- NCBI: proteins

In enzymology, 2-enoate reductase (EC 1.3.1.31) is an enzyme that catalyzes the chemical reaction of α,β-unsaturated carboxylic acids. Crotonic acid is a typical example:

crotonic acid
+ NADH
H^{+}
H^{+}
butyric acid
+ NAD^{+}

The three substrates of this enzyme are crotonic acid, reduced nicotinamide adenine dinucleotide (NADH), and a proton. Its products are butyric acid and oxidised NAD^{+}.

This enzyme belongs to the family of oxidoreductases, specifically those acting on the CH-CH group of donor with NAD+ or NADP+ as acceptor. The systematic name of this enzyme class is butanoate:NAD+ Delta2-oxidoreductase. This enzyme is also called enoate reductase. This enzyme participates in phenylalanine metabolism. It has cofactors: flavin adenine dinucleotide and iron–sulfur protein.
