= X. Peter Zhang =

American Organic Chemist

- Education: Anhui Normal University (B.S.); Beijing Normal University (M.S.); University of Pennsylvania (Ph.D.)
- Known for: Metalloradical catalysis Cobalt(II)–porphyrin catalysis Stereoselective radical reactions Asymmetric catalysis
- Awards: ORAU Ralph Powe Junior Faculty Award (2003); NSF CAREER Award (2006); Thieme Chemistry Journals Award (2009); Arthur C. Cope Scholar Award (2027)
- Scientific career
- Fields: Organic chemistry, Catalysis, Radical chemistry
- Workplaces: University of Tennessee; University of South Florida; Boston College
- Doctoral advisor: Bradford B. Wayland

X. Peter Zhang (Xiao-Xiang Peter Zhang) is an organic chemist and professor of chemistry at Boston College. His research focuses on stereoselective organic synthesis, radical chemistry, and catalysis, including the development of metalloradical catalysis using cobalt and iron complexes.

== Education and career ==
Zhang received a B.S. from Anhui Normal University in 1985 and an M.S. from Beijing Normal University in 1988. He earned his Ph.D. in chemistry from the University of Pennsylvania in 1996 under the supervision of Bradford B. Wayland.

After completing his doctorate, Zhang held postdoctoral appointments at the Massachusetts Institute of Technology, first with Stephen J. Lippard from 1996 to 1999 and then with Stephen L. Buchwald from 1999 to 2001. He began his academic career at the University of Tennessee in 2001. He later joined the University of South Florida, where he was promoted to full professor, before joining the faculty at Boston College in 2015.

== Research ==
Zhang's research focuses on the following areas:

1. Metalloradical catalysis and catalyst design. Zhang's group develops metalloradical catalysis as an approach for controlling radical reactivity and stereoselectivity in organic synthesis. A major component of this work involves cobalt(II) porphyrin complexes and chiral porphyrin ligand design, including modular chiral porphyrins and D_{2}-symmetric chiral amidoporphyrins.
2. Asymmetric radical transformations of alkenes. Zhang's laboratory has applied cobalt-based metalloradical catalysis to stereoselective alkene functionalization, including cyclopropanation and aziridination.
3. C–H functionalization and C–N bond formation. Zhang's group has reported metalloradical methods for C–H functionalization, including asymmetric C–H alkylation through 1,4-hydrogen atom abstraction, intermolecular radical C–H amination, and allylic C–H amination. Other reported applications from the group include radical and radical/ionic approaches to β-functionalized amines and radical dearomative conjugate amination.

== Awards and honors ==
- ORAU Ralph Powe Junior Faculty Award, 2003
- NSF CAREER Award, 2006
- Thieme Chemistry Journals Award, 2009
- Arthur C. Cope Scholar Award, 2027
