= 3-Dimethylaminoacrolein =

Names
- Preferred IUPAC name (2E)-3-(Dimethylamino)prop-2-enal
- Other names 3-Dimethylaminopropenal

Identifiers
CAS Number	692-32-0; 927-63-9 (non-specific)
3D model (JSmol)	Interactive image
ChemSpider	553863
ECHA InfoCard	100.011.962
EC Number	213-157-7
PubChem CID	638320
UNII	5MVV69JD7Z
- InChI: InChI=1S/C5H9NO/c1-6(2)4-3-5-7/h3-5H,1-2H3/b4-3+ Key: RRLMPLDPCKRASL-ONEGZZNKSA-N
- SMILES: CN(C)/C=C/C=O

Properties
Chemical formula	C_{5}H_{9}NO
Molar mass	99.133 g·mol^{−1}
Appearance	Clear, faintly yellow to dark brown liquid
Density	0.99 g·cm^{−3} at 25°C
Boiling point	91 °C at 0.1 kPa; 133–144 °C; 270–273 °C
Solubility in water	Soluble
Solubility in methanol, 1,2-dichloroethane	Soluble

Hazards
- GHS labelling
Pictograms	(GHS05: Corrosive)
Signal word	Danger
Hazard statements	H314
Precautionary statements	P260, P264, P280, P301+P330+P331, P303+P361+P353, P304+P340, P305+P351+P338, P310, P321, P363, P405, P501
- Except where otherwise noted, data are given for materials in their standard state (at 25 °C [77 °F], 100 kPa). Infobox references

3-Dimethylaminoacrolein is an organic compound with the formula Me_{2}NC(H)=CHCHO. It is a pale yellow, water-soluble liquid. A push-pull alkene, it has chemical similarities to malondialdehyde and dimethylformamide.

== Pharmacology ==
3-Dimethylaminoacrolein is a stimulant in humans and animals. It reverses the hypnotic effect of morphine in mice.

== Preparation ==
The simplest notional synthesis of 3-dimethylaminoacrolein is a Reppe hydroamination:

Synthese of Dimethylaminoacrolein from propynal.

However, propynal is too explosive to make this procedure viable.

Instead, 3-dimethylaminoacrolein typically arises from Vilsmeier formylation of a vinyl ether, which gives an enoliminium chloride. Weak bases then cleave the enoliminium cation and recover 3-dimethylaminoacrolein. (Strong bases decompose the product; see § Chemical properties).

For example, in the following reaction sequence, a mixture of phosgene and dimethylformamide forms the Vilsmeier reagent, which then attacks isobutyl vinyl ether. Quenching with dilute NaOH gives the 3-dimethylaminoacrolein:

== Chemical properties ==
3-Dimethylaminoacrolein is weakly alkaline and forms a deep red complex with iron(III) chloride. It is much more stable than its notional parent, 3-aminoacrolein. As a tertiary amine, it cannot tautomerize to the corresponding imine without developing formal charges.

For organic synthesis, it resembles a vinylogous dimethylformamide, combining the unsaturated aldehyde and enamine functionalities. Applications generally fall into two categories: as a less toxic malondialdehyde substitute or as a (reversibly)-quenched enoliminium cation.

An excess of strong aqueous base hydrolyzes 3-dimethylaminoacrolein to malondial through an addition-elimination sequence. Malondial is relatively toxic, and 3-dimethylaminoacrolein is an appealing substitute in heterocycle syntheses. For example, it condenses with guanidine to form 2-aminopyrimidine:

A more elaborate reaction sequence converts 2-naphthylamine to 1-azaphenanthrene.

3-Dimethylaminoacrolein is not interchangeable with malondial, however, because the carbonyl equivalents are differentially activated. Vilsmeier conditions only cause a single addition to N-methylpyrrole:

Another similar electrophilic arene alkenylation occurs in fluvastatin synthesis.

3-dimethylaminoacrolein has been investigated for the industrial synthesis of 2-chloronicotinic acid (2-CNA):

The nitrogen heteroatom's electron-richness extends through the π system, so that the aldehyde is an unusually competent nucleophile. Sulfate diesters alkylate the compound at the aldehyde oxygen, giving an electrophilic cation susceptible to Knoevenagel- or aldol-like addition:

Reaction with an (non-quaternary) ammonium salt gives instead a hemiaminal cation, which can then dehydrate to a vinamidinium cation (discussed further in § Vinamidinium salts).

In some reaction sequences, 3-dimethylaminoacrolein is not isolated, but rather the salt from Vilsmeier attack on the vinyl ether is used directly:

Pyrazolsynthese mit 3-Dimethylaminoacrolein

=== Vinamidinium salts ===
Dimethylammonium salts (chloride, tetrafluoroborate, perchlorate) react with 3-dimethylaminoacrolein to give a vinamidinium cation:

Synthese des 1,3-Bis(dimethylamino)trimethinium perchlorats

The resulting salts also resemble malondial. Thus, they add to cyclopentadienide and α to lactones...

Reaktion von 3-Dimethylaminoacrolein mit gamma-Butyrolacton

...and form a wide variety of heterocycles.
