= Crotyl chloride =

Names
- Preferred IUPAC name (2E)-1-Chlorobut-2-ene
- Other names 1-Chloro-2-butene, 1-chlorobut-2-ene, 2-butenyl chloride, gamma-methylallyl chloride

Identifiers
CAS Number	591-97-9
3D model (JSmol)	Interactive image
Beilstein Reference	605304
ChemSpider	553496
ECHA InfoCard	100.008.855
PubChem CID	637923
RTECS number	EM4264000
UNII	G6Y5C34N83
CompTox Dashboard (EPA)	DTXSID5052258
- InChI: InChI=1S/C4H7Cl/c1-2-3-4-5/h2-3H,4H2,1H3/b3-2+ Key: YTKRILODNOEEPX-NSCUHMNNSA-N; InChI=1/C4H7Cl/c1-2-3-4-5/h2-3H,4H2,1H3/b3-2+ Key: YTKRILODNOEEPX-NSCUHMNNBH
- SMILES: C/C=C/CCl

Properties
Chemical formula	C_{4}H_{7}Cl
Molar mass	90.55 g·mol^{−1}
Appearance	Liquid
Density	0.949 g/cm^{3}
Melting point	−65 °C (−85 °F; 208 K)
Boiling point	84 °C (183 °F; 357 K)
Vapor pressure	37084 mmHG

Hazards
NFPA 704 (fire diamond)	2 3 2
Flash point	−15 °C (5 °F; 258 K)
Autoignition temperature	510 °C (950 °F; 783 K)

Related compounds
Related chloroalkenes	Allyl chloride Methallyl chloride
- Except where otherwise noted, data are given for materials in their standard state (at 25 °C [77 °F], 100 kPa). Infobox references

Crotyl chloride is an organochloride with the molecular formula C_{4}H_{7}Cl or H_{3}C(CH)_{2}CH_{2}Cl. It is a derivative of 2-butene with a chlorine atom at a terminal carbon. It exhibits cis-trans isomerism about the double bond; the (E) isomer predominates in commercial preparations.

== Preparation ==
Crotyl chloride can be produced by the chlorination of crotyl alcohol by chlorinating agents such as triphenylphosphine dichloride.

== Applications ==
Treatment of crotyl halides with magnesium produces crotyl Grignard reagents. The chloride is more stable than the bromide. These reagents can then be used in the Grignard reaction for crotylation of carbonyl compounds.

Dehydrohalogenation of crotyl chloride was once used as a laboratory route to produce butadiene, though the pyrolysis of cyclohexene is preferred according to Organic Syntheses. Crotyl chloride may be used as a model compound for other allylic hydrochlorocarbons.
