= Methallyl chloride =

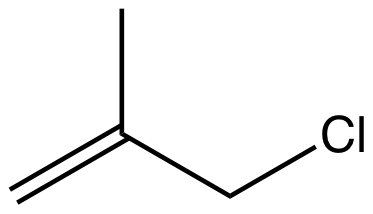

Names
- Preferred IUPAC name 3-Chloro-2-methylprop-1-ene
- Other names Isobutenyl chloride

Identifiers
CAS Number	563-47-3
3D model (JSmol)	Interactive image
ChEBI	CHEBI:82419
ChEMBL	ChEMBL157368
ChemSpider	21106501
ECHA InfoCard	100.008.411
EC Number	209-251-2
KEGG	C19363
PubChem CID	11241
RTECS number	UC8050000
UNII	7A9X1C3I3O
UN number	2554
CompTox Dashboard (EPA)	DTXSID1020279
- InChI: InChI=1S/C4H7Cl/c1-4(2)3-5/h1,3H2,2H3 Key: OHXAOPZTJOUYKM-UHFFFAOYSA-N
- SMILES: CC(=C)CCl

Properties
Chemical formula	C_{4}H_{7}Cl
Molar mass	90.55 g·mol^{−1}
Appearance	Colorless liquid
Density	0.9210 g/cm^{3} (15 °C)
Boiling point	71–72 °C (160–162 °F; 344–345 K)

Hazards
- GHS labelling
Pictograms	(GHS02: Flammable) (GHS05: Corrosive) (GHS06: Toxic) (GHS07: Exclamation mark) (GHS08: Health hazard) (GHS09: Environmental hazard)
Signal word	Danger
Hazard statements	H225, H302, H314, H317, H331, H335, H336, H351, H361, H372, H373, H411
Precautionary statements	P201, P202, P210, P233, P240, P241, P242, P243, P260, P264, P270, P271, P272, P273, P280, P281, P301+P312, P301+P330+P331, P302+P352, P303+P361+P353, P304+P340, P305+P351+P338, P308+P313, P310, P311, P312, P314, P321, P330, P333+P313, P363, P370+P378, P391, P403+P233, P403+P235, P405, P501
Flash point	−12 °C (10 °F; 261 K)
Autoignition temperature	540 °C (1,004 °F; 813 K)
- Except where otherwise noted, data are given for materials in their standard state (at 25 °C [77 °F], 100 kPa). Infobox references

Methallyl chloride is the organic compound with the formula CH_{2}=C(CH_{3})CH_{2}Cl. It is a colorless liquid and a lacrymator. Its properties are similar to those of allyl chloride. It is a strong alkylating agent used to install isobutenyl groups.

== Reactivity ==
It is also a precursor to methallyl ligand. It is an isomer of crotyl chloride.

Methylenecyclopropane can be synthesised via an intramolecular cyclisation reaction from methallyl chloride by treatment with a strong base such as sodium amide.

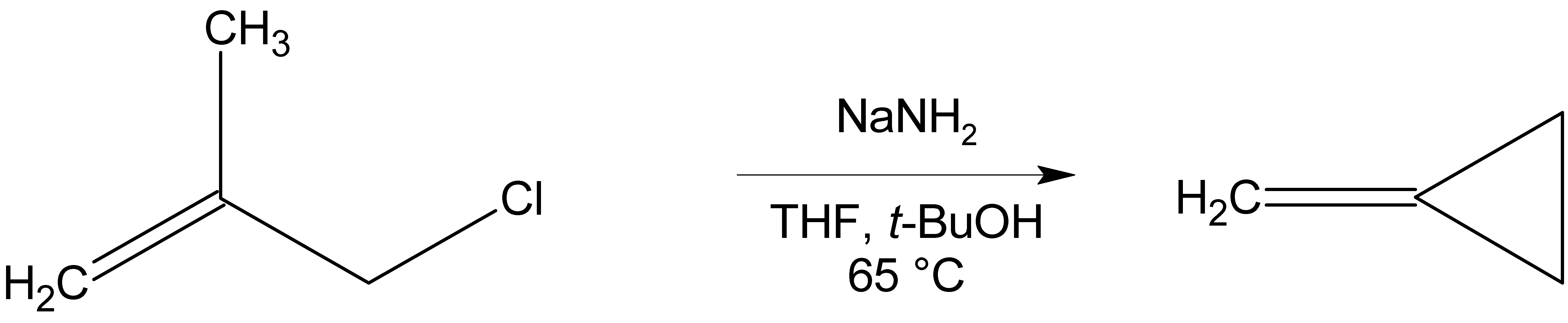
