= (−)-menthol dehydrogenase =

Class of enzymes

Identifiers
- EC no.: 1.1.1.207
- CAS no.: 81811-46-3

Databases
- BRENDA: enzyme data
- ExPASy: NiceZyme view
- KEGG: enzyme entry
- MetaCyc: metabolic pathway
- Rhea: reactions
- PDB structures: RCSB PDB PDBe PDBsum
- Gene Ontology: AmiGO / QuickGO
Search
- PMC: articles
- PubMed: articles
- NCBI: proteins

(−)-Menthol dehydrogenases (EC 1.1.1.207) are a type of enzyme found in mint plants (mentha) that catalyzes the chemical reaction

(-)-menthol
+ NADP^{+}
H^{+}
H^{+}
(-)-menthone
+ NADPH

The two substrates of this enzyme are (−)-menthol and oxidised nicotinamide adenine dinucleotide phosphate (NADP^{+}). Its products are (−)-menthone, reduced NADPH, and a proton.

This enzyme belongs to the family of oxidoreductases, specifically those acting on the CH-OH group of donor with NAD^{+} or NADP^{+} as acceptor. The systematic name of this enzyme class is (−)-menthol:NADP^{+} oxidoreductase. This enzyme is also called monoterpenoid dehydrogenase. This enzyme participates in monoterpenoid biosynthesis.

== See also ==
- (+)-neomenthol dehydrogenase
