= Potassium azodicarboxylate =

Names
- IUPAC name Dipotassium N-carboxylatoiminocarbamate
- Other names Potassium azocarbonate

Identifiers
CAS Number	4910-62-7
3D model (JSmol)	Interactive image
ChemSpider	5019560
PubChem CID	6096233
UNII	XE5GCW5Y4B
- InChI: InChI=1S/C2H2N2O4.2K/c5-1(6)3-4-2(7)8;;/h(H,5,6)(H,7,8);;/q;2*+1/p-2 Key: UYKSYRMKGNNMMU-UHFFFAOYSA-L
- SMILES: C(=O)(N=NC(=O)[O-])[O-].[K+].[K+]

Properties
Chemical formula	C_{2}K_{2}N_{2}O_{4}
Molar mass	194.229 g·mol^{−1}
Appearance	Yellow crystals
- Except where otherwise noted, data are given for materials in their standard state (at 25 °C [77 °F], 100 kPa). Infobox references

Potassium azodicarboxylate is a chemical compound with the formula C_{2}K_{2}N_{2}O_{4}. This chemical is used as a precursor to diimide. It can be synthesized by the reaction of potassium hydroxide with azodicarbonamide and it reacts with carboxylic acids to form diimide.
