= NADPH dehydrogenase =

Type of oxidoreductase enzyme

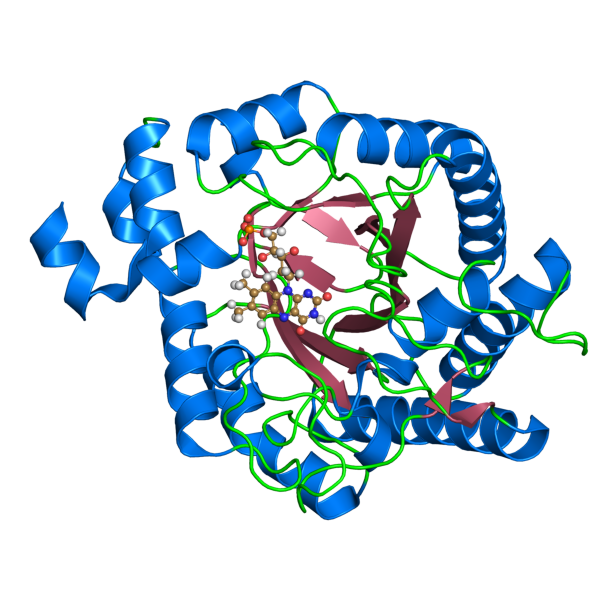
- X-ray structure of Xenobiotic Reductase A from Pseudomonas putida. PDB entry 3l5l

Identifiers
- EC no.: 1.6.99.1
- CAS no.: 9001-68-7

Databases
- BRENDA: enzyme data
- ExPASy: NiceZyme view
- KEGG: enzyme entry
- MetaCyc: metabolic pathway
- Rhea: reactions
- PDB structures: RCSB PDB PDBe PDBsum
- Gene Ontology: AmiGO / QuickGO
Search
- PMC: articles
- PubMed: articles
- NCBI: proteins

In enzymology, a NADPH dehydrogenase (EC 1.6.99.1) is an enzyme that catalyzes the chemical reaction: NADPH + H^{+} + acceptor $\rightleftharpoons$ NADP^{+} + reduced acceptor.

The three substrates of this enzyme are NADPH, H^{+}, and acceptor, whereas its two products are NADP^{+} and reduced acceptor.

This enzyme belongs to the family of oxidoreductases, specifically those acting on NADH or NADPH with other acceptors. It has two cofactors: FAD, and FMN.

== Nomenclature ==
The systematic name of this enzyme class is NADPH:acceptor oxidoreductase. Other names in common use include

- NADPH2 diaphorase
- NADPH diaphorase
- old yellow enzyme
- diaphorase
- dihydronicotinamide adenine dinucleotide phosphate dehydrogenase
- NADPH-dehydrogenase
- NADPH-diaphorase
- NADPH2-dehydrogenase
- reduced nicotinamide adenine dinucleotide phosphate dehydrogenase
- TPNH dehydrogenase
- TPNH-diaphorase
- triphosphopyridine diaphorase
- triphosphopyridine nucleotide diaphorase
- NADPH2 dehydrogenase
- NADPH:(acceptor) oxidoreductase.
