= Butenedioic acid =

Butenedioic acid may refer to either of two enantiomers:

- Fumaric acid, or trans-butenedioic acid
- Maleic acid, or cis-butenedioic acid
