= Crotyl group =

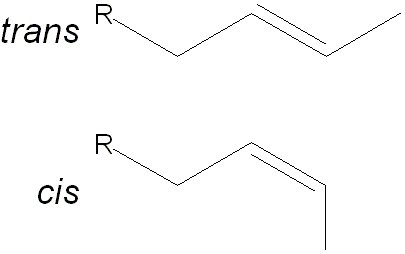
Crotyl groups attached to R.

A crotyl group is an organic functional group with the formula RCH_{2}CH=CHCH_{3}. Systematically, it is called a but-2-en-1-yl group and exhibits geometric isomerism, being either cis (Z) or trans (E). There are many simple compounds in which the crotyl group forms base carbon chain: crotyl alcohol, crotonaldehyde, crotonic acid, and crotyl acrylate are examples.

== Synthesis of crotylates ==
Crotylate (crotyl anions) can be synthesised from 2-butene (either isomer) by deprotonation with highly basic organometallic reagents, typically organolithium reagents. The negative charge is delocalised over three of the carbon atoms of the crotylate group.

== Crotylation reactions ==
Crotyl halides, crotyl alcohols, crotyl silanes, crotonaldehyde and crotyl boronates are useful reagents for synthesizing crotyl and allyl compounds. Crotyl and allyl compounds are common intermediates in total synthesis due to their ability to undergo sigmatropic rearrangements.

Crotylboronates are easily made from reaction of crotyl anions with alkoxy boronates, and are useful reagents in the formation of crotyl and allyl alcohols.

Trans-crotonaldehyde is commonly used to determine the effective Lewis acidity of Lewis acids, determined from the change in ^{1}H NMR shift of the crotonaldehyde handle on binding to a Lewis acid. Limitations of the method include secondary interactions to the ^{1}H NMR handle obscuring the true effect of the Lewis acid, and weak donor strengths of trans-crotonaldehyde resulting in incomplete Lewis acid-base adduct formation.
