= 1,4-Dioxene =

Names
- Preferred IUPAC name 2,3-Dihydro-1,4-dioxine

Identifiers
CAS Number	543-75-9
3D model (JSmol)	Interactive image
ChemSpider	120126
ECHA InfoCard	100.204.758
PubChem CID	136353
UNII	964XEE4JQL
CompTox Dashboard (EPA)	DTXSID0074714
- InChI: InChI=1S/C4H6O2/c1-2-6-4-3-5-1/h1-2H,3-4H2 Key: HIZVCIIORGCREW-UHFFFAOYSA-N; InChI=1/C4H6O2/c1-2-6-4-3-5-1/h1-2H,3-4H2 Key: HIZVCIIORGCREW-UHFFFAOYAE
- SMILES: O1/C=C\OCC1

Properties
Chemical formula	C_{4}H_{6}O_{2}
Molar mass	86.090 g·mol^{−1}
Appearance	Colourless liquid
- Except where otherwise noted, data are given for materials in their standard state (at 25 °C [77 °F], 100 kPa). Infobox references

1,4-Dioxene is an organic compound with the formula (C_{2}H_{4})(C_{2}H_{2})O_{2}. The compound is derived from dioxane by dehydrogenation. It is a colourless liquid.
