= Β-Butyrolactone =

β-Butyrolactone

Names
- Preferred IUPAC name 4-Methyloxetan-2-one

Identifiers
CAS Number	3068-88-0
3D model (JSmol)	Interactive image
ChEBI	CHEBI:82296
ChEMBL	ChEMBL1361205
ChemSpider	17288
ECHA InfoCard	100.019.392
EC Number	221-330-3
KEGG	C19201
PubChem CID	18303
UNII	8BB68V31MT
UN number	1993
CompTox Dashboard (EPA)	DTXSID1020223
- InChI: InChI=1S/C4H6O2/c1-3-2-4(5)6-3/h3H,2H2,1H3 Key: GSCLMSFRWBPUSK-UHFFFAOYSA-N
- SMILES: CC1CC(=O)O1

Properties
Chemical formula	C_{4}H_{6}O_{2}
Molar mass	86.090 g·mol^{−1}
Appearance	Colourless to light yellow liquid
Boiling point	71–73 °C (160–163 °F; 344–346 K) 39 hPa
Solubility in water	268 g·l^{−1}
Solubility	Soluble in various organic solvents

Hazards
- GHS labelling
Pictograms	(GHS02: Flammable) (GHS07: Exclamation mark) (GHS08: Health hazard)
Signal word	Warning
Hazard statements	H226, H315, H319, H351
Precautionary statements	P201, P202, P210, P233, P240, P241, P242, P243, P264, P280, P281, P302+P352, P303+P361+P353, P305+P351+P338, P308+P313, P321, P332+P313, P337+P313, P362, P370+P378, P403+P235, P405, P501
- Except where otherwise noted, data are given for materials in their standard state (at 25 °C [77 °F], 100 kPa). Infobox references

β-Butyrolactone is the intramolecular carboxylic acid ester (lactone) of the optically active 3-hydroxybutanoic acid. It is produced during chemical synthesis as a racemate. β-Butyrolactone is suitable as a monomer for the production of the biodegradable polyhydroxyalkanoate poly(3-hydroxybutyrate) (PHB). Polymerisation of racemic (RS)-β-butyrolactone provides (RS)-polyhydroxybutyric acid, which, however, is inferior in essential properties (e.g. strength or degradation behaviour) to the (R)-poly-3-hydroxybutyrate originating from natural sources.

== Production ==
β-Butyrolactone is obtained in 63% yield by the addition of ethanal to ethenone (ketene) in the presence of the clay mineral montmorillonite.

Synthese von β-Butyrolacton aus Keten

For this purpose, ethenone can also be produced in-situ by dehydrobromination of acetyl bromide with the Hünig base diisopropylethylamine. In the presence of a chiral aluminium complex, the ethenone reacts enantioselectively to (S)-β-butyrolactone in 92% yield with an enantiomeric excess ee of over 98%.

Synthese von β-Butyrolacton aus Keten über Acetylbromid-Route

Hydrogenation of diketene at a palladium contact catalyst provides β-butyrolactone in 93% yield.

Synthese von β-Butyrolacton aus Diketen

The asymmetric hydrogenation of diketene with a ruthenium BINAP catalyst to optically active (R)-β-butyrolactone with 97% selectivity and 92% enantiomeric excess is also described.

At 50 °C and approx. 60 bar CO pressure, (R)-2-methyloxirane (propylene oxide) is carbonylated to (R)-β-butyrolactone under retention of the configuration in 95% yield, if a homogeneous carbonylation catalyst [(salph)Al(THF)_{2}][Co(CO)_{4}] according to Geoffrey Coates is used (accessible from a modified aluminium-salene complex [(salph)AlCl and sodium tetracarbonyl cobaltate NaCo(CO)_{4}]).

Synthese von β-Butyrolacton aus Propylenoxid

The carbonylation of 2-methyloxirane in the presence of homogeneous porphyrin-carbonylcobaltate catalysts in tetrahydrofuran also succeeds at approx. 14 bar carbon monoxide partial pressure and yields β-butyrolactone in 97% yield.

Due to the problems with the separation and recycling of homogeneous carbonylation catalysts, heterogeneous polymer analogs have recently also been investigated, which deliver similarly high yields (up to 96%) at 60 bar CO pressure. However, these catalysts do not yet appear to be promising candidates for industrial application as they show drastically lower catalytic activity in 50 mm molar laboratory batches.

The cheap starting material butane-1,3-diol can be converted with the oxidizing agent barium manganate (BaMnO_{4}) in acetonitrile under microwave irradiation within 1h to β-butyrolactone (74% yield).

Synthese von β-Butyrolacton aus 1,3-Butandiol

== Properties ==
β-Butyrolactone is a clear liquid that smells like acetone or mint. It is miscible with water and soluble in many organic solvents. According to an IARC classification, β-butyrolactone is assigned to group 2B: "possibly carcinogenic".

== Use ==
(R)-β-butyrolactone reacts in toluene at approx. 14 bar CO pressure and 55 °C in the presence of a salen complex within 24 h with inversion of the configuration in 94% yield to optically pure (> 99% ee) (S)-methyl succinic anhydride.

Carbonylierung von β-BL zu 2-Methylsuccinanhydrid

=== Homo- and copolymers from β-butyrolactone ===
The commercialization of the polyhydroxybutyric acid (PHB) or of homo- and copolymeric polyhydroxyalkanoates as aerobically biodegradable thermoplastics isolated from bacteria under the brand name Biopol of Imperial Chemical Industries (ICI) in 1983 set the starting point for the search for synthetic alternatives which were to avoid the disadvantages of PHB such as brittleness and stiffness, thermal decomposition at temperatures just above the melting temperature (175 - 180 °C) and in particular uncompetitive costs due to expensive fermentation, isolation and purification.

The ring-opening polymerization of (S)-β-butyrolactone with diethylzinc ZnEt_{2}/water produces poly-(S)-3-hydroxybutyrate with ee > 97% under retention of the configuration at the chiral carbon atom:

Ringöffnende Polymerisation von (S)-β-BL

With tin compounds (distannoxanes) as catalysts, the polymerization of (R)-β-butyrolactone also produces high molecular weight (M_{n} > 100,000) synthetic (R)-polyhydroxybutyrates with retention, which resemble the natural polyhydroxyalkanoates.

The anionic polymerization of optically active β-butyrolactone leads to crystalline, isotactic polyhydroxybutyrates under inversion, whose low polydispersity M_{w}/M_{n} ≈ 1,2 indicate a living polymerization.

Anionische ringöffnende Polymerisation von β-Butyrolacton

Also strong bases such as diazabicycloundecene (DBU), 1,5,7-triazabicyclo(4.4.0)dec-5-en (TBD) and the phosphazene BEMP are able to catalyze the ring-opening polymerization of β-butyrolactone in substance at 60 °C achieving a low molecular weight PHBs (M_{n} < 21.000) with narrow molecular weight distribution.

The cationic ring-opening polymerization of β-butyrolactone with strong acids such as trifluoromethanesulfonic acid leads to low-molecular PHBs (M_{n} < 8,200) with living hydroxyl chain ends to which, for example, caprolactone blocks can be copolymerized.

Kationische Copolymerisation von β-BL mit Caprolacton

With yttrium-based catalysts racemic β-butyrolactone can be converted into (mainly) syndiotactic PHB with narrow molecular weight distribution.

Polymerisation von rac-β-BL zu syndiotaktischer PHB

N-heterocyclic carbenes (NHCs) of the imidazol-2-ylidene type are strong nucleophiles and are also suitable as initiators for the ring-opening polymerization of lactones such as β-butyrolactone.

Ringöffnende Polymerisation von β-BL mit N-heterocyclischen Carbenen (NHCs)

Synthetic PHB variants, which were developed as homopolymers of β-butyrolactone or copolymers with other lactones, have so far not been able to compensate for the weaknesses of the biogenic material - in particular unfavourable mechanical and thermal properties and high price. Instead, new problems with toxic heavy metals in the catalysts (e.g. tin, cobalt or chromium) and atactic polymer components (liquid and difficult to separate) with undesirable material properties have been introduced. Even more than 30 years after its market launch, the economic success of the biopolymer Biopol and its (bio)synthetic analogues is still modest, and despite ambitious capacity targets (actual global polyhydroxyalkanoate production capacity 2018: approx. 30,000 tons) sales have so far lagged far behind the optimistic forecasts of the manufacturers.
