= Tetrolic acid =

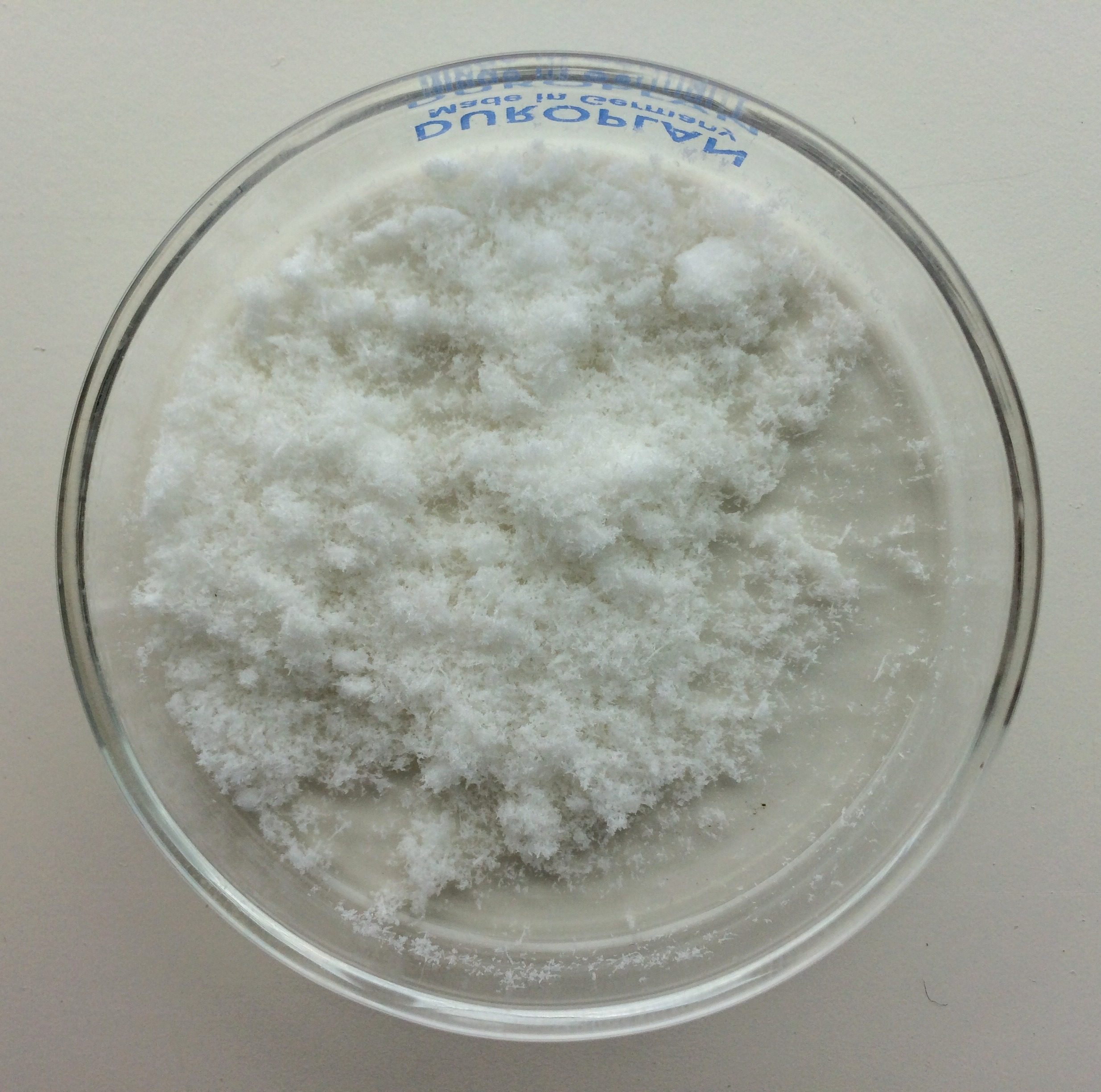

Names
- Preferred IUPAC name But-2-ynoic acid
- Other names 2-Butynoic acid Butynoic acid

Identifiers
CAS Number	590-93-2
3D model (JSmol)	Interactive image
ChemSpider	61810
ECHA InfoCard	100.008.815
PubChem CID	68535
UNII	W3AM9ANZ22
CompTox Dashboard (EPA)	DTXSID4060444
- InChI: InChI=1S/C4H4O2/c1-2-3-4(5)6/h1H3,(H,5,6) Key: LUEHNHVFDCZTGL-UHFFFAOYSA-N
- SMILES: CC#CC(=O)O

Properties
Chemical formula	CH_{3}C≡CCO_{2}H
Molar mass	84.074 g·mol^{−1}
Density	0.9641 g/cm^{3}
Melting point	78 °C (172 °F; 351 K)
Boiling point	203 °C (397 °F; 476 K)

Related compounds
Related compounds	but-3-enoic acid
- Except where otherwise noted, data are given for materials in their standard state (at 25 °C [77 °F], 100 kPa). Infobox references

Tetrolic acid (2-butynoic acid) is a short-chain unsaturated carboxylic acid, described by the formula CH_{3}−C≡C−CO_{2}H. Salts and esters of tetrolic acid are known as tetrolates.

== History ==
The first reported synthesis of tetrolic acid is believed to be by German chemist Johann Georg Anton Geuther in 1871 as part of his work investigating the derivatives of ethyl acetoacetate.

== Production ==
Tetrolic acid is manufactured on a commercial scale by treatment of propyne with a strong base (to form an acetylide), followed by carbon dioxide:

Scheme2

Strong bases such as n-BuLi and NaNH_{2} can be used.

== Properties ==
Tetrolic acid is highly soluble in polar solvents (water, ethanol) and can be recrystallized from non-polar solvents (such as heptane, hexane or toluene). The compound is a white crystalline solid which can exist in two polymorphous crystalline forms.

The proton nuclear magnetic resonance (^{1}H-NMR) spectrum in deuterated dimethyl sulfoxide shows a characteristic singlet peak at 1.99 ppm corresponding to the –CH_{3} protons.

Tetrolic acid sublimes at temperatures above 20 °C, so it is typically stored in a sealed container in a refrigerator.

Accelerated rate calorimetry (ARC) showed exothermic onset from 135 °C, precluding short-path distillation as a means of purification.
