= But-3-enoic acid =

Names
- Other names: vinylacetic acid; allylic acid; 3-butenoic acid; β-butenoic acid

Identifiers
CAS Number	625-38-7
3D model (JSmol)	Interactive image
ChEBI	CHEBI:35897
ChemSpider	30349
ECHA InfoCard	100.009.902
EC Number	210-892-5
Gmelin Reference	362641
PubChem CID	32743
CompTox Dashboard (EPA)	DTXSID60211539
- InChI: InChI=1S/C4H6O2/c1-2-3-4(5)6/h2H,1,3H2,(H,5,6) Key: PVEOYINWKBTPIZ-UHFFFAOYSA-N
- SMILES: OC(=O)CC=C

Properties
Chemical formula	C_{4}H_{6}O_{2}
Molar mass	86.090 g·mol^{−1}
Appearance	Clear light yellow liquid
Density	1.013 g/mL
Melting point	−39 °C (−38 °F; 234 K)
Boiling point	163 °C (325 °F; 436 K)
Solubility in water	Well-soluble

Hazards
- GHS labelling
Pictograms	(GHS09: Environmental hazard) (GHS05: Corrosive) (GHS07: Exclamation mark) (GHS08: Health hazard)
Signal word	Danger
Hazard statements	H314, H317, H335, H341, H351, H411
Precautionary statements	P202, P273, P280, P303, P304, P305, P310, P338, P340, P351, P353, P361

Related compounds
Related compounds	But-2-ynoic acid; Butenoic acid; Crotonic acid
- Except where otherwise noted, data are given for materials in their standard state (at 25 °C [77 °F], 100 kPa). Infobox references

But-3-enoic acid (or 3-butenoic acid) is a short-chain unsaturated carboxylic acid, with the linear formula CH_{2}=CHCH_{2}CO_{2}H.

== Synthesis ==
The acid is obtained via a reaction of allyl cyanide and concentrated hydrochloric acid. The mixture is gently heated with occasional shaking. The reaction produces a voluminous precipitate of ammonium chloride. Then water is introduced, and the upper acid layer is separated.

Other methods are also known.

== Properties ==
The acid forms a clear light yellow liquid. Causes skin burns.

The compound is well-soluble in water, ethanol, and diethyl ether.

== Uses ==
The acid has been employed in preparing specialized coatings and complex organic compounds, including those involving Diels-Alder reactions.
