= Crotonic acid =

4-Carbon monounsaturated fatty acid

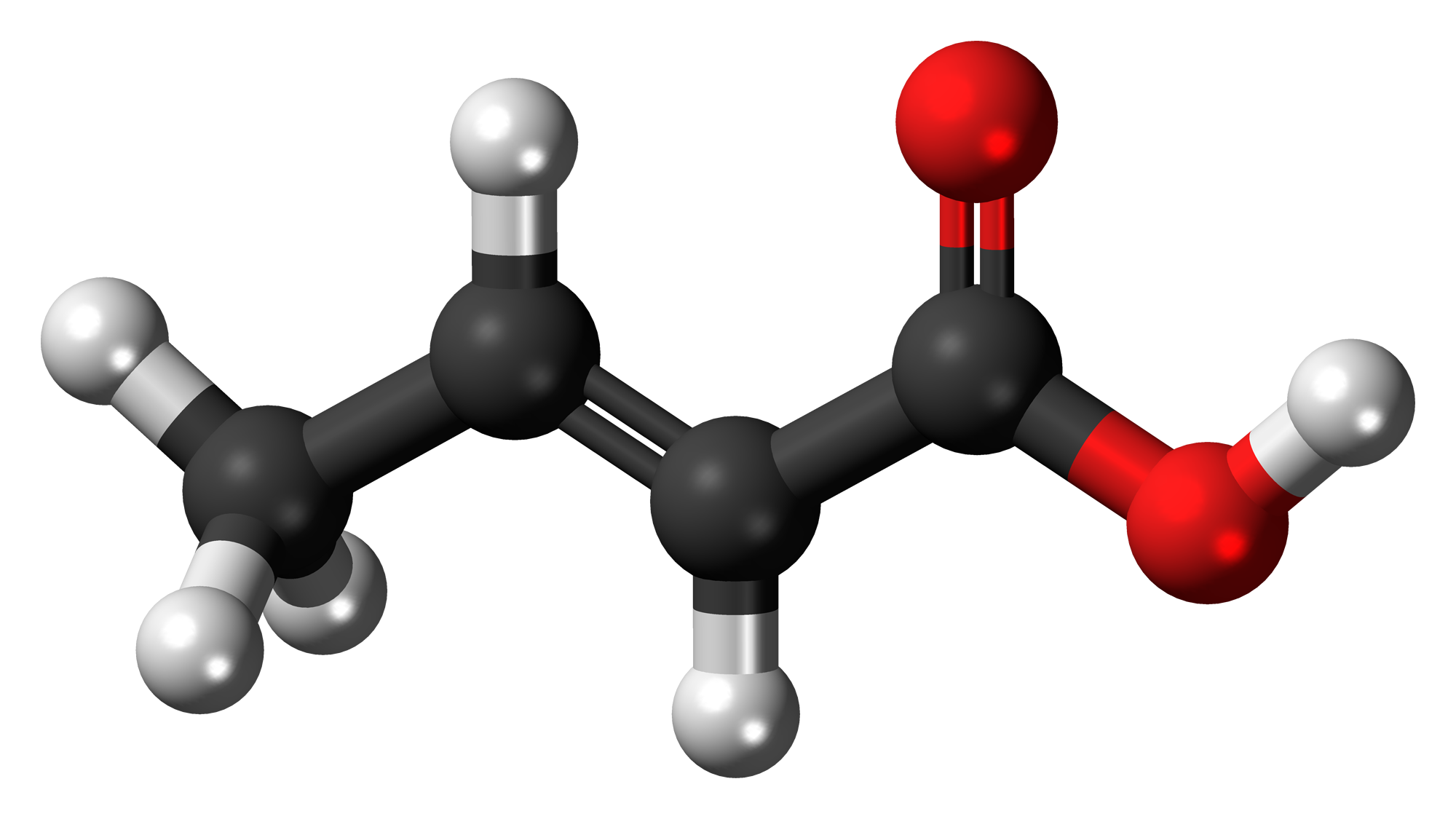

Names
- Preferred IUPAC name (2E)-But-2-enoic acid
- Other names (E)-But-2-enoic acid (E)-2-Butenoic acid Crotonic acid trans-2-Butenoic acid β-Methylacrylic acid 3-Methylacrylic acid

Identifiers
| CAS Number | 107-93-7 |
| 3D model (JSmol) | Interactive image; Interactive image |
| ChEBI | CHEBI:41131 |
| ChEMBL | ChEMBL1213528 |
| ChemSpider | 552744 |
| DrugBank | DB02074 |
| ECHA InfoCard | 100.003.213 |
| PubChem CID | 637090 |
| UNII | YW5WZZ4O5Q |
| CompTox Dashboard (EPA) | DTXSID30880973 |
- InChI: InChI=1S/C4H6O2/c1-2-3-4(5)6/h2-3H,1H3,(H,5,6)/b3-2+ Key: LDHQCZJRKDOVOX-NSCUHMNNSA-N; InChI=1/C4H6O2/c1-2-3-4(5)6/h2-3H,1H3,(H,5,6)/b3-2+ Key: LDHQCZJRKDOVOX-NSCUHMNNBH
- SMILES: C/C=C/C(O)=O; O=C(O)/C=C/C

Properties
| Chemical formula | C_{4}H_{6}O_{2} |
| Molar mass | 86.090 g·mol^{−1} |
| Density | 1.02 g/cm^{3} |
| Melting point | 70 to 73 °C (158 to 163 °F; 343 to 346 K) |
| Boiling point | 185 to 189 °C (365 to 372 °F; 458 to 462 K) |
| Acidity (pK_{a}) | 4.69 |

Hazards
| Safety data sheet (SDS) | SIRI.org |

Related compounds
| Other anions | crotonate |
| Related carboxylic acids | propionic acid acrylic acid butyric acid succinic acid malic acid tartaric acid fumaric acid pentanoic acid tetrolic acid |
| Related compounds | butanol butyraldehyde crotonaldehyde 2-butanone 3-Butenoic acid |
- Except where otherwise noted, data are given for materials in their standard state (at 25 °C [77 °F], 100 kPa). verify (what is ?) Infobox references

Crotonic acid ((2E)-but-2-enoic acid) is a short-chain unsaturated carboxylic acid described by the formula CH_{3}CH=CHCO_{2}H. The name crotonic acid was given because it was erroneously thought to be a saponification product of croton oil. It crystallizes as colorless needles from hot water. With a cis-alkene, Isocrotonic acid is an isomer of crotonic acid. Crotonic acid is soluble in water and many organic solvents. Its odor is similar to that of butyric acid.

== Production ==
Crotonic acid produced industrially by oxidation of crotonaldehyde:

CH_{3}CH=CHCHO +1/2O_{2} → CH_{3}CH=CHCO_{2}H

A number of other methods exist, including the Knoevenagel condensation of acetaldehyde with malonic acid in pyridine:

The alkaline hydrolysis of allyl cyanide followed by the intramolecular rearrangement of the double bond:

Furthermore, it is formed during the distillation of 3-hydroxybutyric acid:

== Properties ==
Crotonic acid crystallizes in the monoclinic crystal system in the space group P21/a (space group 14, position 3) with the lattice parameters a = 971 pm, b = 690 pm, c = 775 pm and β = 104.0°. The unit cell contains four formula units.

== Reactions ==
Crotonic acid converts into butyric acid by hydrogenation or by reduction with zinc and sulfuric acid.

Upon treatment with chlorine or bromine, crotonic acid converts to 2,3-dihalobutyric acids:

Crotonic acid adds hydrogen bromide to form 3-bromobutyric acid.

The reaction with alkaline potassium permanganate solution affords 2,3-dihydroxybutyric acid.

Upon heating with acetic anhydride, crotonic acid converts to the acid anhydride:

Esterification of crotonic acid using sulfuric acid as a catalyst provides the corresponding crotonate esters:

Crotonic acid reacts with hypochlorous acid to 2-chloro-3-hydroxybutyric acid. This can either be reduced with sodium amalgam to butyric acid, can form with sulfuric acid 2-chlorobutenoic acid, react with hydrogen chloride to 2,3-dichlorobutenoic acid or with potassium ethoxide to 3-methyloxirane-2-carboxylic acid.

Crotonic acid reacts with ammonia at the alpha position in the presence of mercury(II) acetate. This reaction provides dl-threonine.

== Use ==
Crotonic acid is mainly used as a comonomer with vinyl acetate. The resulting copolymers are used in paints and adhesives.

Crotonyl chloride reacts with N-ethyl-2-methylaniline (N-ethyl-o-toluidine) to provide crotamiton, which is used as an agent against scabies.

Crotamiton synthesis

== Safety ==
Its LD_{50} is 1 g/kg (oral, rats). It irritates eyes, skin, and respiratory system.

== See also ==
- Crotyl
- Crotyl alcohol
- Isocrotonic acid
- Methacrylic acid
