= Azeotrope tables =

Boiling points of liquid mixtures

This page contains tables of azeotrope data for various binary and ternary mixtures of solvents. The data include the composition of a mixture by weight (in binary azeotropes, when only one fraction is given, it is the fraction of the second component), the boiling point (b.p.) of a component, the boiling point of a mixture, and the specific gravity of the mixture. Boiling points are reported at a pressure of 760 mm Hg unless otherwise stated. Where the mixture separates into layers, values are shown for upper (U) and lower (L) layers.

The data were obtained from Lange's 10th edition and CRC Handbook of Chemistry and Physics 44th edition unless otherwise noted (see color code table).

A list of 15825 binary and ternary mixtures was collated and published by the American Chemical Society. An azeotrope databank is also available online through the University of Edinburgh.

== Binary azeotropes ==
Data source color code
CRC & Lange's	CRC only	Lange's only	other (see references)

==== Binary azeotropes of water, b.p.=100 °C ====
2nd Component	b.p. of comp. (˚C)	b.p. of mixture (˚C)	% by weight	spef. grav
with various alcohols
ethanol	78.4	78.1	95.5	0.804
methanol	64.7	No azeotrope		
1-propanol	97.3	87.7	71.7	0.866
2-propanol	82.5	80.4	87.7	0.818
n-butanol	117.8	92.4	55.5; U 79.9; L 7.7	U 0.849; L 0.990
sec-butanol	99.5	88.5	67.9	0.863
isobutanol	108.0	90.0	70.0; U 85.0; L 8.7	U 0.839; L 0.988
tert-butanol	82.8	79.9	88.3	
allyl alcohol	97.0	88.2	72.9	0.905
furfuryl alcohol	169.4	98.5	20	
cyclohexanol	161.1	97.8	20	
benzyl alcohol	205.4	99.9	9	
with various organic acids
formic acid	100.8	107.3	77.5	
acetic acid ^{‡}	118.1	No azeotrope		
propionic acid	141.1	99.98	17.7	1.016
butyric acid	163.5	99.94	18.4	1.007
isobutyric acid	154.5	99.3	21	
with mineral acids
nitric acid	83.0	120.5	68	1.405
perchloric acid	110.0	203	71.6	
hydrofluoric acid	19.9	120	37	
hydrochloric acid	–84	110	20.24	1.102
hydrobromic acid	–73	126	47.5	1.481
hydroiodic acid	–34	127	57	
sulfuric acid	290	338	98	
with various alkyl halides
ethylene chloride	83.7	72	91.8	
propylene chloride	96.8	78	89.4	
chloroform	61.2	56.1	97.2; U 0.8; L 99.8	U 1.004; L 1.491
carbon tetrachloride	76.8	66.8	95.9; U 0.03; L 99.97	U 1.000; L 1.597
methylene chloride	40.0	38.8	99.6; U 2.0; 99.9	U 1.009; L 1.328
with various esters
ethyl acetate	77.1	70.4	91.9; U 96.7; L 8.7	U 0.907; L 0.999
methyl acetate	57.0	56.1	95.0	0.940
n-propyl acetate	101.6	82.4	86	
isopropyl acetate	88.7	75.9	88.9	
ethyl nitrate	87.7	74.4	78	
with various other solvents
acetone ^{‡}	56.5	No azeotrope		
methyl ethyl ketone	79.6	73.5	89	0.834
pyridine	115.5	92.6	57	1.010
benzene	80.2	69.3	91.1; U 99.94; L 0.07	U 0.880; L 0.999
toluene	110.8	84.1	79.8; U 99.95; L 0.06	U 0.868; L 1.000
cyclohexane	80.7	69.8	91.5; U 99.99; L 0.01	U 0.780; L 1.00
CPME	106	83	83.7	
MTBE	55	52.9	96.5	
diethyl ether	34.5	34.2	98.7	0.720
tetrahydrofuran	66	64.2	95	
2-methyltetrahydrofuran	80.2	71	89.4	
anisole	153.9	95.5	59.5	
acetonitrile	82.0	76.5	83.7	0.818
chloral	97.75	95.0	93.0	
hydrazine	113.5	120.3	68.5	
m-xylene	139.0	92.0	64.2	

^{‡} CRC 44th ed. lists azeotropes for acetic acid/water and acetone/water, Lange's 10th ed. as well as numerous web sources indicate no azeotrope for these pairs.

==== Binary azeotropes of allyl alcohol, b.p.=97.0 °C ====
2nd Component	b.p. of comp. (˚C)	b.p. of mixture (˚C)	% by weight	spef. grav
with various solvents
methyl butyrate	102.7	93.8	45	
n-propyl acetate	101.6	94.2	47	
benzene	80.2	76.8	82.6	0.874
toluene	110.8	92.4	50	
cyclohexane	80.8	74	80	
carbon tetrachloride	76.8	72.3	88.5	1.450
ethylene chloride	83.7	79.9	82	

==== Binary azeotropes of ethanol, b.p.=78.4 °C ====
2nd Component	b.p. of comp. (˚C)	b.p. of mixture (˚C)	% by weight	spef. grav
with various esters
ethyl acetate	77.1	71.8	69.2	0.863
methyl acetate	57.0	56.9	97	
ethyl nitrate	87.7	71.9	56	
isopropyl acetate	88.4	76.8	47	
with various hydrocarbons
benzene	80.2	68.2	67.6	0.848
cyclohexane	80.7	64.9	69.5	
toluene	110.8	76.7	32	0.815
n-pentane	36.2	34.3	95	
n-hexane	68.9	58.7	79	0.687
n-heptane	98.5	70.9	51	0.729
n-octane	125.6	77.0	22	
with various alkyl halides
ethylene chloride	83.7	70.5	63	
chloroform	61.1	59.4	93	1.403
carbon tetrachloride	76.8	65.1	84.2	1.377
allyl chloride	45.7	44	95	
n-propyl chloride	46.7	45.0	93	
isopropyl chloride	36.3	35.6	97.2	
n-propyl bromide	71.0	62.8	79.5	
isopropyl bromide	59.8	55.6	89.5	
n-propyl iodide	102.4	75.4	56	
isopropyl iodide	89.4	71.5	73	
methyl iodide	42.6	41.2	96.8	
methylene chloride	40.1	39.85	95.0	
ethyl bromide	38.0	37.0	97.0	
trichloroethylene	87	70.9	73.0	1.197
trichlorotrifluoroethane (CFC 113)	47.7	43.8	96.2	1.517
tetrachloroethylene	121.0	76.75	37.0	
with various other solvents
water	78.4	78.1	4.5	0.804
methyl ethyl ketone	79.6	74.8	60	0.802
acetonitrile	82.0	72.9	43.0	0.788
nitromethane	101.3	75.95	26.8	
tetrahydrofuran P = 100 kPa	65.6	65	96.7	
2-methyltetrahydrofuran	80.2	74.4	66	
thiophene	84.1	70.0	55.0	
carbon disulfide	46.2	42.4	92	

==== Binary azeotropes of methanol, b.p.=64.7 °C ====
2nd Component	b.p. of comp. (˚C)	b.p. of mixture (˚C)	% by weight	spef. grav
with various esters
methyl acetate	57.0	53.8	81.3	0.908
ethyl acetate	77.1	62.3	56	0.846
ethyl formate	54.1	51.0	84	
with various hydrocarbons
benzene	80.2	58.3	60.5	0.844
toluene	110.8	63.8	31	0.813
cyclohexane	80.8	45.2	62.8; U 97.0; L 39.0	
n-pentane	36.2	30.8	91	
n-hexane	68.9	60	71.6	
n-heptane	98.5	59.1	48.5	
n-octane	125.8	63.0	72.0	
with various alkyl halides
methylene chloride	40.0	37.8	92.7	
ethylene chloride	83.7	61.0	68	
chloroform	61.1	53.5	87.4	1.342
carbon tetrachloride	76.8	55.7	79.4	1.322
ethyl bromide	38.4	35.0	95.5	
n-propyl chloride	46.6	40.5	90.5	
isopropyl chloride	36.4	33.4	94	
n-propyl bromide	71.0	54.5	79	
isopropyl bromide	59.8	48.6	85.0	
isopropyl iodide	89.4	61.0	62	
trichloroethylene	87.2	60.2	64	
tetrachloroethylene	121.1	63.5	40.6	
trichlorotrifluoroethane (CFC 113)	47.7	39.9	94	
with various other solvents
nitromethane	101.2	64.6	9	
acetone	56.5	55.7	87.9	0.796
acetonitrile	82.0	63.45	19.0	
carbon disulfide	46.2	37.7	86.0; U 50.8; L 97.2	U 0.979; L 1.261
isopropyl alcohol	82.5	64.0	20	
tetrahydrofuran P = 984 mBar	65.6	60.7	69.0	
2-methyltetrahydrofuran	80.2	62.7	43	
MTBE	55	51.3	68.6	

==== Binary azeotropes of n-propanol, b.p.=97.2 °C ====
2nd Component	b.p. of comp. (˚C)	b.p. of mixture (˚C)	% by weight	spef. grav
with various solvents
methyl butyrate	102.7	94.4	51	
n-propyl formate	80.8	80.65	97	
n-propyl acetate	101.6	94.7	49	0.833
benzene	80.2	77.1	83.1	
toluene	110.8	92.4	47.5	0.836
n-hexane	68.9	65.7	96	
carbon tetrachloride	76.8	73.1	88.5	1.437
ethylene chloride	83.7	80.7	81	
n-propyl bromide	71.0	69.7	91	
2-methyltetrahydrofuran	80.2	79.5	99	

==== Binary azeotropes of acetic acid, b.p.=118.5 °C ====
2nd Component	b.p. of comp. (˚C)	b.p. of mixture (˚C)	% by weight	spef. grav
with various solvents
benzene	80.2	80.05	98	0.882
cyclohexane	80.8	79.7	98	
toluene	110.8	105.0	72	0.905
m-xylene	139.0	115.4	27.5	0.908
mesitylene	164.6	118	3.6	
n-heptane	98.5	92.3	70	
n-octane	125.8	109.0	50	
isopropyl iodide	89.2	88.3	91	
carbon tetrachloride	76.8	76.6	97	
tetrachloroethylene	121.0	107.4	61.5	
ethylene bromide	131.7	114.4	45	
1,1-dibromoethane	109.5	103.7	75.0	
methylene bromide	98.2	94.8	84.0	
pyridine	115.3	139.7	65.0	1.024

==== Binary azeotropes of Isopropyl alcohol, b.p.=82.5 °C ====
2nd Component	b.p. of comp. (˚C)	b.p. of mixture (˚C)	% by weight	spef. grav
with various esters
ethyl acetate	77.1	75.3	75	0.869
isopropyl acetate	91.0	81.3	40	0.822
with various hydrocarbons
benzene	80.2	71.9	66.7	0.838
toluene ^{‡}	110.8	80.6	42	
cyclohexane	80.7	68.6	67.0	0.777
n-pentane	36.2	35.5	94	
n-hexane	68.9	62.7	77	
n-heptane	98.5	76.3	46	
with various alkyl halides
carbon tetrachloride	76.8	69.0	82	1.344
chloroform	61.1	60.8	95.8	
ethylene chloride	83.7	74.7	56.5	
ethyl iodide	83.7	67.1	85	
n-propyl chloride	46.7	46.4	97.2	
n-propyl bromide	71.0	66.8	79.5	
isopropyl bromide	59.8	57.8	88	
n-propyl iodide	102.4	79.8	58	
isopropyl iodide	89.4	76.0	68	
tetrachloroethylene	121.1	81.7	19.0	
with various other solvents
methyl ethyl ketone	79.0	77.5	68	0.800
diisopropyl ether	69	66.2	85.9	
nitromethane	101.0	79.3	70	
2-methyltetrahydrofuran	80.2	77	82	

^{‡} CRC and Lange's disagree on this azeotrope, but web source corroborates CRC

==== Binary azeotropes of formic acid, b.p.=100.8 °C ====
2nd Component	b.p. of comp. (˚C)	b.p. of mixture (˚C)	% by weight	spef. grav
with various hydrocarbons
benzene	80.2	71.7	69	
toluene	110.8	85.8	50	
m-xylene	139.0	94.2	29.8	
m-xylene	139.0	92.8	28.2	
o-xylene	143.6	95.5	26	
p-xylene	138.4	~95	30.0	
n-pentane	36.2	34.2	90	
n-hexane	68.9	60.6	72	
n-heptane	98.5	78.2	56.5	
n-octane	125.8	90.5	37	
with various alkyl halides
chloroform	61.2	59.2	85	
carbon tetrachloride	76.8	66.7	81.5	
methyl iodide	42.6	42.1	94	
ethyl bromide	38.4	38.2	97	
ethylene chloride	83.6	77.4	86	
ethylene bromide	131.7	94.7	48.5	
n-propyl chloride	46.7	45.6	92	
isopropyl chloride	34.8	34.7	98.5	
n-propyl bromide	71.0	64.7	73	
isopropyl bromide	59.4	56.0	86	
with various other solvents
carbon disulfide	46.3	42.6	83	

==== Binary azeotropes of benzene, b.p.=80.1 °C ====
2nd Component	b.p. of comp. (˚C)	b.p. of mixture (˚C)	% by weight	spef. grav
cyclohexane	80.74	77.8	45.0	0.834
ethyl nitrate	88.7	80.03	12.0	
methyl ethyl ketone	79.6	78.4	37.5	0.853
nitromethane	101.0	79.15	14.0	
acetonitrile	82.0	73.0	34.0	
n-heptane	98.5	80.0	1	

==== Binary azeotropes of ethylene glycol, b.p.=197.4 °C ====
2nd Component	b.p. of comp. (˚C)	b.p. of mixture (˚C)	% by weight	spef. grav
with various solvents
ethyl benzoate	212.6	186.1	53.5	
diphenyl	254.9	192.0	36	
mesitylene	164.6	156.0	87	
naphthalene	218.1	183.9	49	
toluene	110.8	110.2	93.5	
m-xylene	139.0	135.6	85	
o-xylene	144.4	139.6	84.0	
ethylene bromide	131.7	129.8	96	
nitrobenzene	210.9	185.9	41	
chlorobenzene	132.0	130.1	5.6	
benzyl chloride	179.3	167.0	70	
benzyl alcohol	205.1	193.1	44	
anisole	153.9	150.5	89.5	
acetophenone	202.1	185.7	48	
aniline	184.4	180.6	76	
o-cresol	191.1	189.6	73	

==== Binary azeotropes of glycerol, b.p.=291.0 °C ====
2nd Component	b.p. of comp. (˚C)	b.p. of mixture (˚C)	% by weight	spef. grav
diphenyl	254.9	243.8	45	
naphthalene	218.1	215.2	90	

==== Binary azeotropes of acetone, b.p.=56.5 °C ====
2nd Component	b.p. of comp. (˚C)	b.p. of mixture (˚C)	% by weight	spef. grav
carbon disulfide	46.3	39.3	67.0	1.04
chloroform	61.2	64.7	80.0	1.268
cyclohexane	80.74	53.0	33.0	
n-hexane	68.8	49.8	41	
ethyl iodide	56.5	55.0	40.0	
carbon tetrachloride	76.8	56.2	11.9	

==== Miscellaneous azeotrope pairs ====
component 1	b.p. comp. 1 (˚C)	component 2	b.p. comp. 2 (˚C)	b.p. azeo. (˚C)	% wt comp. 1	% wt comp. 2	spec. grav.
acetaldehyde	21.0	diethyl ether	34.6	20.5	76.0	24.0	0.762
acetaldehyde	21.0	n-butane	–0.5	–7.0	16.0	84.0	
acetamide	222.0	benzaldehyde	179.5	178.6	6.5	93.5	
acetamide	222.0	nitrobenzene	210.9	202.0	24.0	76.0	
acetamide	222.0	o-xylene	144.1	142.6	11.0	89.0	
acetonitrile	82.0	ethyl acetate	77.15	74.8	23.0	77.0	
acetonitrile	82.0	toluene	110.6	81.1	76.0	24.0	
acetylene	–86.6	ethane	–88.3	–94.5	40.7	59.3	
aniline	184.4	o-cresol	191.5	191.3	8.0	92.0	
carbon disulfide	46.2	diethyl ether	34.6	34.4	1.0	99.0	0.719
carbon disulfide	46.2	1,1-dichloroethane	57.2	46.0	94.0	6.0	
carbon disulfide	46.2	methyl ethyl ketone	79.6	45.9	84.7	15.3	1.157
carbon disulfide	46.2	ethyl acetate	77.1	46.1	97	3	
carbon disulfide	46.2	methyl acetate	57.0	40.2	73	27	
chloroform	61.2	methyl ethyl ketone	79.6	79.9	17.0	83.0	0.877
chloroform	61.2	n-hexane	68.7	60.0	72.0	28.0	1.101
carbon tetrachloride	76.8	methyl ethyl ketone	79.9	73.8	71.0	29.0	1.247
carbon tetrachloride	76.8	ethylene dichloride	84.0	75.3	78.0	22.0	1.500
carbon tetrachloride	76.8	ethyl acetate	77.1	74.8	57.0	43.0	1.202
cyclohexane	80.74	ethyl acetate	77.15	72.8	46.0	54.0	
cyclohexane	80.74	ethyl nitrate	88.7	74.5	64.0	36.0	
diethyl ether	34.6	methyl formate	31.50	28.2	44.0	56.0	
diethyl ether	34.6	methylene chloride	40	40.8	30	70	
nitromethane	101.0	toluene	110.8	96.5	55.0	45.0	
tetrahydrofuran	65.6	chloroform	61.2	72.5	34.5	65.5	
tetrahydrofuran	65.6	n-hexane	69	63.0	46.5	53.5	
toluene	110.63	pyridine	115.3	110.2	78.0	22.0	
toluene	110.63	2-methyltetrahydrofuran	80.2	none	-	-	
propylene glycol	188.2	aniline	184.4	179.5	43	57	
propylene glycol	188.2	o-xylene	144.4	135.8	10	90	
propylene glycol	188.2	toluene	110.6	110.5	1.5	98.5	

== Ternary azeotropes ==
Tables of various ternary azeotropes (that is azeotropes consisting of three components). Fraction percentages are given by weight.

Data source color code
CRC & Lange's	CRC only	Lange's only	other (see references)

==== Ternary azeotropes of water, b.p.=100 °C ====
2nd component	b.p. 2nd comp. (˚C)	3rd component	b.p. 3rd comp. (˚C)	b.p. azeo. (˚C)	% wt 1st	% wt 2nd	% wt 3rd	spec. grav
ethanol	78.4	ethyl acetate	77.1	70.3	7.8	9.0	83.2	0.901
ethanol	78.4	cyclohexane	80.8	62.1	7	17	76	
ethanol	78.4	benzene	80.2	64.9	7.4; U 1.3; L 43.1	18.5; U 12.7; L 52.1	74.1; U 86.0; L 4.8	U 0.866; L 0.892
ethanol	78.4	chloroform	61.2	55.5	3.5; U 80.8; L 0.5	4.0; U 18.2; L 3.7	92.5; U 1.0; L 95.8	U 0.976; L 1.441
ethanol	78.4	carbon tetrachloride	86.8	61.8	4.3	9.7	86.0	
ethanol	78.4	carbon tetrachloride	86.8	61.8	3.4; U 44.5; L <0.1	10.3; U 48.5; L 5.2	86.3; U 7.0; L 94.8	U 0.935; L 1.519
ethanol	78.4	ethylene chloride	83.7	66.7	5	17	78	
ethanol	78.4	acetonitrile	82.0	72.9	1.0	55.0	44.0	
ethanol	78.4	toluene	110.6	74.4	12.0; U 3.1; L 20.7	37.0; U 15.6; L 54.8	51.0; U 81.3; L 24.5	U 0.849; L 0.855
ethanol	78.4	methyl ethyl ketone	79.6	73.2	11.0	14.0	75.0	0.832
ethanol	78.4	n-hexane	69.0	56.0	3.0; U 0.5; L 19.0	12.0; U 3.0; L 75.0	85.0; U 96.5; L 6.0	U 0.672; L 0.833
ethanol	78.4	n-heptane	98.4	68.8	6.1; U 0.2; L 15.0	33.0; U 5.0; L 75.9	60.9; U 94.8; L 9.1	U 0.686; L 0.801
ethanol	78.4	carbon disulfide	46.2	41.3	1.6	5.0	93.4	
n-propanol	97.2	cyclohexane	80.8	66.6	8.5	10.0	81.5	
n-propanol	97.2	benzene	80.2	68.5	8.6	9.0	82.4	
n-propanol	97.2	carbon tetrachloride	76.8	65.4	5 U 84.9; L 1.0	11; U 15.0; L 11.0	84; U 0.1; L 88.0	U 0.979; L 1.436
n-propanol	97.2	diethyl ketone	102.2	81.2	20	20	60	
n-propanol	97.2	n-propyl acetate	101.6	82.2	21.0	19.5	59.5	
Isopropyl alcohol	82.5	cyclohexane	80.8	64.3	7.5	18.5	74.0	
Isopropyl alcohol	82.5	cyclohexane	80.8	66.1	7.5	21.5	71.0	
Isopropyl alcohol	82.5	benzene	80.2	66.5	7.5	18.7	73.8	
Isopropyl alcohol	82.5	benzene	80.2	65.7	8.2; U 2.3; L 85.1	19.8; U 20.2; L 14.4	72.0; U 77.5; L 0.5	U 0.855; L 0.966
Isopropyl alcohol	82.5	methyl ethyl ketone	79.6	73.4	11.0	1.0	88.0	0.834
Isopropyl alcohol	82.5	toluene	110.6	76.3	13.1; U 8.5; L 61.0	38.2; U 38.2; L 38.0	48.7; U 53.3; L 1.0	U 0.845; L 0.930
allyl alcohol	97.0	n-hexane	69.0	59.7	5 U 0.5; L 64.4	5 U 3.6; L 34.8	90; U 95.9; L 0.8	U 0.668; L 0.964
allyl alcohol	97.0	benzene	80.2	68.2	8.6; U 0.6; L 80.9	9.2; U 8.7; L 17.7	82.2; U 90.7; L 0.4	U 0.877; L 0.985
allyl alcohol	97.0	cyclohexane	80.8	66.2	8	11	81	
allyl alcohol	97.0	carbon tetrachloride	76.8	65.2	5 U 71.7; L 0.8	11; U 25.6; L 10.1	84; U 2.7; L 89.1	U 0.777; L 1.464
benzene	80.1	acetonitrile	82.0	66.0	8.2	68.5	23.3	
benzene	80.1	methyl ethyl ketone	79.6	68.2	8.8; U 0.6; L 94.7	65.1; U 71.3; L 0.1	26.1; U 28.1; L 5.2	U 0.858; L 0.992
methyl ethyl ketone	79.6	carbon tetrachloride	76.8	65.7	3.0; U 94.4; L 0.1	22.2; U 5.5; L 22.6	74.8; U 0.1; L 77.3	U 0.993; L 1.313
methyl ethyl ketone	79.6	cyclohexane	81.0	63.6	5.0; U 0.6; L 89.9	60.0; U 37.0; L 10.0	35.0; U 62.4; L 0.1	U 0.769; L 0.98
chloroform	61.2	methanol	64.65	52.6	4.0; U 27.0; L 3.0	81.0; U 32.0; L 83.0	15.0; U 41.0; L 14.0	U 1.022; L 1.399
chloroform	61.2	acetone^{‡}	56.5	60.4	4.0	57.6	38.4	

^{‡}Saddle azeotrope

==== Ternary azeotropes of methanol, b.p.=64.65 °C ====
2nd component	b.p. 2nd comp. (˚C)	3rd component	b.p. 3rd comp. (˚C)	b.p. azeo. (˚C)	% wt 1st	% wt 2nd	% wt 3rd	spec. grav
acetone	56.5	chloroform^{‡}	61.2	57.5	23.0	30.0	47.0	
acetone	56.5	methyl acetate	57.0	53.7	17.4	5.8	76.8	0.898
acetone	56.5	cyclohexane	81.4	51.5	16.0	43.5	40.5	
methyl acetate	57.1	carbon disulfide	46.2	37.0				
methyl acetate	57.1	cyclohexane	81.4	50.8	17.8	48.6	33.6	
methyl acetate	57.1	n-hexane	69.0	45.0	14.0	27.0	59.0	0.73

^{‡}Saddle azeotrope
