= Chloropropane =

Chloride name

Chloropropane may refer to:

- n-Propyl chloride (1-chloropropane)
- Isopropyl chloride (2-chloropropane)
