= C3H7Cl =

The molecular formula C_{3}H_{7}Cl (molar mass: 78.54 g/mol, exact mass: 78.0236 u) may refer to:

- n-Propyl chloride, also known as 1-propyl chloride or 1-chloropropane
- Isopropyl chloride
