= C3H7I =

The molecular formula C_{3}H_{7}I (molar mass: 169.99 g/mol, exact mass: 169.9592 u) may refer to:

- Isopropyl iodide
- n-Propyl iodide (also 1-propyl iodide or 1-iodopropane)
