= Hauser base =

Hauser bases, also called magnesium amide bases, are magnesium compounds used in organic chemistry as bases for metalation reactions. These compounds were first described by Charles R. Hauser in 1947. Compared with organolithium reagents, the magnesium compounds have more covalent, and therefore less reactive, metal-ligand bonds. Consequently, they display a higher degree of functional group tolerance and a much greater chemoselectivity. Generally, Hauser bases are used at room temperature while reactions with organolithium reagents are performed at low temperatures, commonly at −78 °C.

== Structures ==
Hauser bases have the empirical formula R_{2}NMgX (X = halide). The crystallize as dimers with halide bridges. Attached to Mg is amido (R_{2}N) ligands derived from secondary amines 2,2,6,6-tetramethylpiperidine (TMP^{−}) and HMDS^{−}).

Amido-bridged Hauser bases exist when the amido ligand is less bulky, such as Et_{2}N^{−} and Ph_{3}P=N^{−}.

Structures of Selected Hauser Bases (H atoms removed for clarity)

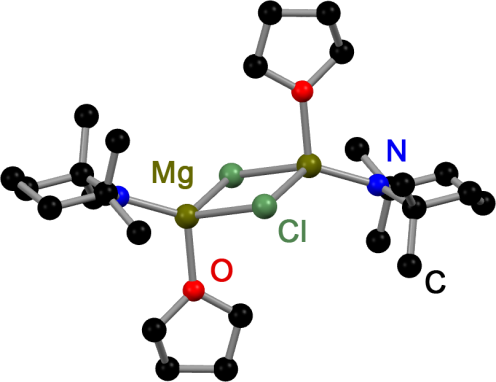
TMP Hauser Base

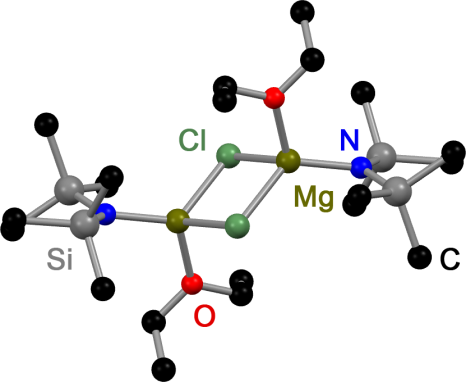
HMDS Hauser Base

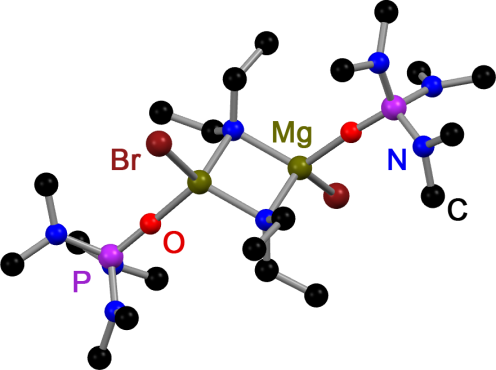
Diethylamido Hauser Base

The structures of Hauser bases in solution have been investigated by diffusion-ordered NMR spectroscopy (DOSY). These studies indicate that iPr_{2}NMgCl is subject to the Schlenk equilibrium:

iPr_{2}NMgCl (A) ⇌ (iPr_{2}N)_{2}Mg (B) + MgCl_{2}

This equilibrium is temperature-dependent: heteroleptic (A) are the main species at high temperatures and homoleptic (B) dominate at lower temperatures. Dimeric species with bridging chlorides and amides are also present in the THF solution. At low temperatures, adducts of MgCl_{2} are present in solution.

== Preparation and reactions ==
The Hauser bases are prepared by treating a secondary amine with a Grignard reagent:

R_{2}NH + R′MgX → R_{2}NMgX + R′H X = Cl, Br, I

(:R_{2}NH = diisopropylamine, TMP)

Like many organolithium reagents, Hauser bases are generally used for metalation reagents. iPr_{2}NMgBr selectively magnesiate carboxamides. iPr_{2}NMgX (X = Cl, Br) effect the deprotonation thiophenes. and phenylsulphonyl-substituted indoles.

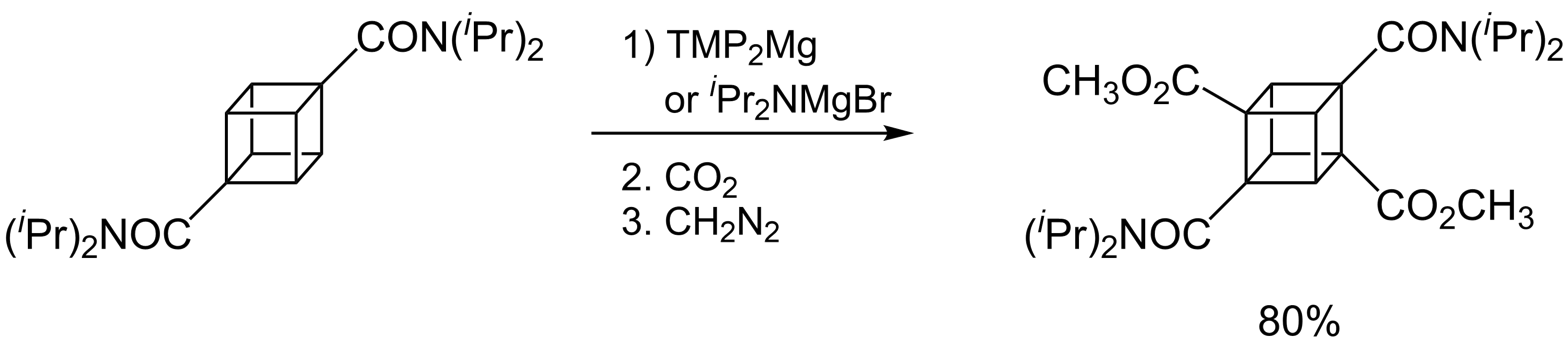

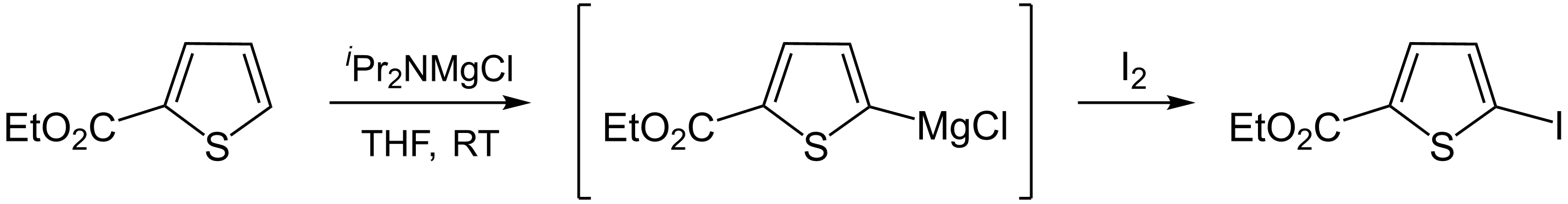

== Turbo-Hauser base ==
A major disadvantage of Hauser bases is their poor solubility in THF. In consequence, the metalation rates are slow and a large excess of base is required (e.g., 10 equiv.). This circumstance complicates the functionalization of the metaled intermediate with an electrophile. Improved solubility and reactivity can be achieved by adding stoichiometric amounts of LiCl to the Hauser base. These so-called Turbo-Hauser bases like e.g. TMPMgCl·LiCl and iPr_{2}NMgCl·LiCl are commercially available. They show an enhanced kinetic basicity, regioselectivity and functional group tolerance.
