= Turbo-Hauser bases =

Amido magnesium halides containing significant lithium chloride components

Turbo-Hauser bases are amido magnesium halides that contain stoichiometric amounts of LiCl. These mixed Mg/Li amides of the type R_{2}NMgCl⋅LiCl are used in organic chemistry as non-nucleophilic bases for metalation reactions of aromatic and heteroaromatic substrates. Compared to their LiCl free ancestors Turbo-Hauser bases show an enhanced kinetic basicity, excellent regioselectivity, high functional group tolerance and a better solubility.

== Preparation ==
Typically Turbo-Hauser bases are prepared by treating an amine with a Grignard reagent and lithium chloride. In some cases they are prepared by treating a lithium amide with MgCl_{2}:

RMgX + LiCl + R'_{2}NH → LiMg(NR'_{2})Cl_{2} + RH
R'_{2}NLi + MgCl_{2} → LiMg(NR'_{2})Cl_{2}

Common Turbo-Hauser bases: R'2NH = iPr_{2}NMgCl·LiCl (iPr-Turbo-Hauser base), TMPMgCl·LiCl, TMP (Turbo-Hauser base or Knochel-Hauser Base)

== Structure ==
In solution, Turbo-Hauser bases participate in temperature- and concentration-dependent equilibria. Diffusion-Ordered Spectroscopy (DOSY) show that at room temperature and high concentrations (0.6 M) dimeric [iPr_{2}NMgCl·LiCl]_{2} remains intact solution.

=== Solid State Structure ===
The iPr-Turbo-Hauser base crystallizes as a dimeric amido bridged contact ion pair (CIP). Due to the high steric demand of the TMP ligand the dimerization process is sterically hindered. This is why the TMP-Turbo-Hauser base crystallizes as a monomeric CIP. In both structures LiCl coordinates to the magnesium amides.

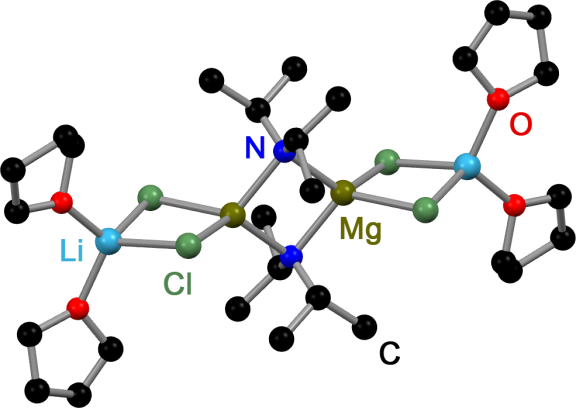
iPr-Turbo-Hauser Base in the solid state

.

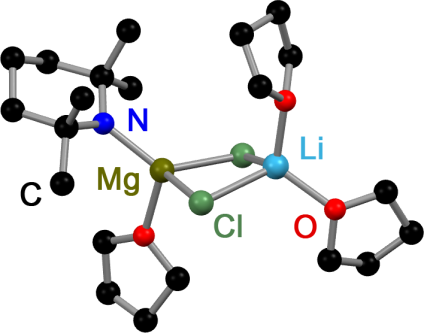
TMP-Turbo-Hauser Base in the solid state

.

(thf)_{2}Li(μ−Cl)_{2}Mg(v−NiPr_{2})_{2}Mg(μ−Cl)_{2}Li(thf)_{2} + 2 thf ⇌ 2 (thf)(NiPr_{2})Mg_{2}(μ−Cl)_{2}Li(thf)_{2}

(thf)_{2}Li(μ−Cl)_{2}Mg(v−NiPr_{2})_{2}Mg(μ−Cl)_{2}Li(thf)_{2} ⇌ [Mg(NiPr_{2})(μ−Cl)(thf)]_{2} + [Li(μ−Cl)(thf)_{2}]_{2}

The solid state structure of TMPMgCl·LiCl is retained almost completely in THF solution independently of temperature and concentration. Due to the high steric demand of the TMP ligand, the THF ligand dissociates from the magnesium cation. This dissociation gives a magnesium amido complex with enhanced reactivity for deprotonation of C-H bonds.

(thf)R_{2}NMg(μ−Cl)_{2}Li(thf) ⇌ R_{2}NMg(μ−Cl)_{2}Li(thf) + thf

== Reactions ==
Turbo-Hauser bases are used as metalation/deprotonation reagents. In this way, they resemble some organolithium reagents. The lithiated compounds, however, are only stable at low temperatures (e.g. -78 °C) and suffer competing addition reactions (like e.g. Chichibabin reactions). In contrast, the magnesium compounds are less reactive. The magnesium amide complex is stabilized by LiCl. Turbo-Hauser bases display a high functional group tolerance and greater chemoselectivity at high and low temperatures. The resulting reagent is then quenched with an electrophile.

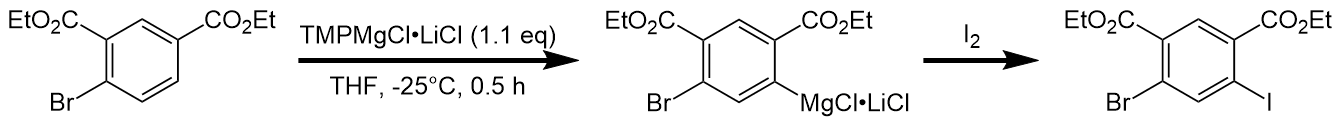

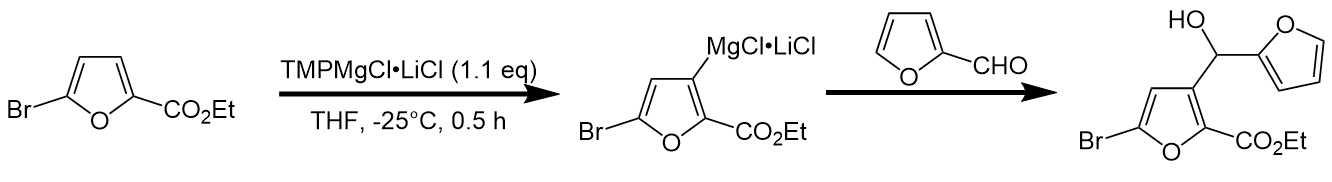

iPr_{2}NMgCl·LiCl and TMPMgCl·LiCl react differently. The TMP-Turbo-Hauser base easily metalates ethyl-3-chlorobenzoate in the C2 position, while the same reaction carried out with the iPr-Turbo-Hauser base resulted in no metalation at all. Instead, an addition-elimination reaction occurs.

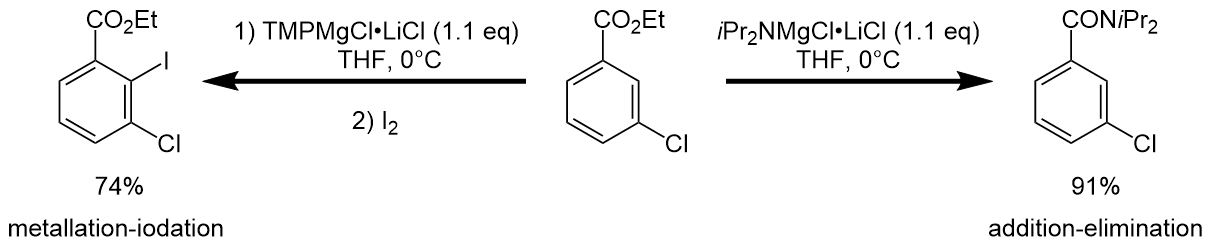
Contrasting reactivity of iPr_{2}NMgCl·LiCl and TMPMgCl·LiCl

Another difference is illustrated by the differing rates of deprotonation of isoquinoline in THF solution. Whereas TMPMgCl·LiCl required only 2h and 1.1 equivalents, iPr_{2}NMgCl·LiCl needed 12h and 2 equivalents for comparable metalation.

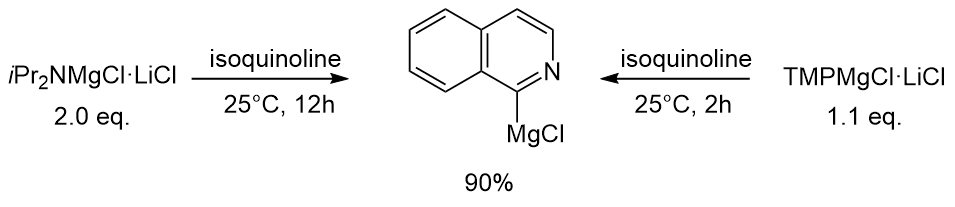
Contrasting reactivity of iPr_{2}NMgCl·LiCl and TMPMgCl·LiCl

The differing reactivity of the TMP vs iPr-based reagents is related to the fact that the TMP is always a terminal ligand whereas iPr_{2}N is sometimes bridging (μ-). Generally, in organolithium chemistry monomeric species display the most active kinetic species. This could explain why reactions of the monomeric TMP-Turbo-Hauser base are much faster than that of dimeric iPr-Turbo-Hauser base. The regioselective ortho deprotonation reactions of TMPMgCl·LiCl could stem from a sufficient complex-induced proximity effect (CIPE) between the bimetallic aggregate and the functionalized (hetero)aromatic substrate.

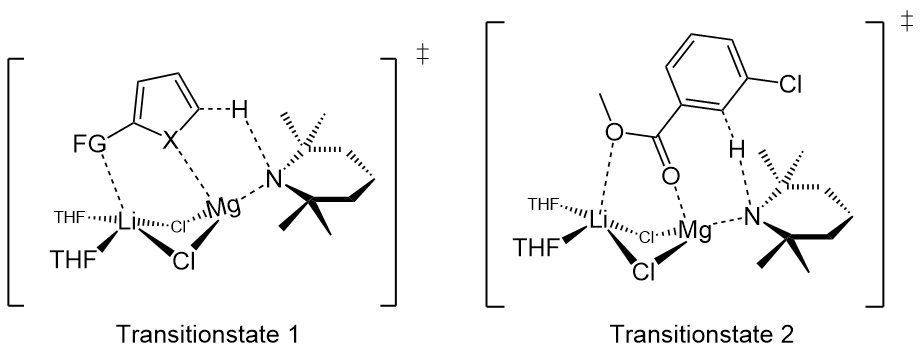
Proposed complex-induced proximity effect (CIPE) in a TMPMgCl·LiCl mediated reaction

== Related reagents ==
- Turbo-Grignard reagents used for halide/Mg exchange reactions. "Turbo-Grignards", as they are often called, are aggregates with the formula [i-PrMgCl·LiCl]_{2}
- Organozinc-LiCl complexes
