= CPME =

CPME may refer to:

- Cyclopentyl methyl ether, a chemical compound used as a solvent
- Standing Committee of European Doctors (Comité Permanent des Médecins Européens), a medical organization representing all medical doctors in the European Union
