= 1-Propanol (data page) =

Chemical data page

This page provides supplementary chemical data on 1-Propanol (n-propanol).

== Material Safety Data Sheet ==
The handling of this chemical may incur notable safety precautions. It is highly recommended that you seek the Material Safety Datasheet (MSDS) for this chemical from a reliable source.

== Structure and properties ==
Structure and properties
Index of refraction, n_{D}
1.383 at 25 °C
Abbe number
?
Dielectric constant, ε_{r}
20.1 ε_{0} at 25 °C
Bond strength
?
Bond length
?
Bond angle
?
Magnetic susceptibility
?
Surface tension
23.78 dyn/cm at 20 °C
Viscosity

3.893 mPa·s	at 0 °C
2.52 mPa·s	at 15 °C
2.256 mPa·s	at 20 °C
1.72 mPa·s	at 30 °C
1.405 mPa·s	at 40 °C
1.130 mPa·s	at 50 °C
0.760 mPa·s	at 70 °C

== Thermodynamic properties ==
Phase behavior
Triple point	148.75 K (−124.4 °C), ? Pa
Critical point	536.9 K (263.8 °C), 5200 kPa
Std enthalpy change of fusion, Δ_{fus}H^{~~o~~}	5.37 kJ/mol
Std entropy change of fusion, Δ_{fus}S^{~~o~~}	36 J/(mol·K)
Std enthalpy change of vaporization, Δ_{vap}H^{~~o~~}	47.5 kJ/mol
Std entropy change of vaporization, Δ_{vap}S^{~~o~~}	126.6 J/(mol·K)
Solid properties
Std enthalpy change of formation, Δ_{f}H^{~~o~~}_{solid}	−763 kJ/mol
Standard molar entropy, S^{~~o~~}_{solid}	112.7 J/(mol K)
Heat capacity, c_{p}	106.3 J/(mol K) at −124 °C
Liquid properties
Std enthalpy change of formation, Δ_{f}H^{~~o~~}_{liquid}	−303.0 kJ/mol
Standard molar entropy, S^{~~o~~}_{liquid}	192.8 J/(mol K)
Enthalpy of combustion, Δ_{c}H^{~~o~~}	−2021 kJ/mol
Heat capacity, c_{p}	144.4 J/(mol K)
Gas properties
Std enthalpy change of formation, Δ_{f}H^{~~o~~}_{gas}	−255 kJ/mol
Standard molar entropy, S^{~~o~~}_{gas}	322.49 J/(mol K)
Heat capacity, c_{p}	85.56 J/(mol K) at 25°
van der Waals' constants	a = 1512 L^{2} kPa/mol^{2} b = 0.1029 liter per mole

== Vapor pressure of liquid ==
P in mm Hg	1	10	40	100	400	760	1520	3800	7600	15200	30400	45600
T in °C	−15.0	14.7	36.4	52.8	82.0	97.8	117.0	149.0	177.0	210.8	250.0	—

Table data obtained from CRC Handbook of Chemistry and Physics 44th ed.

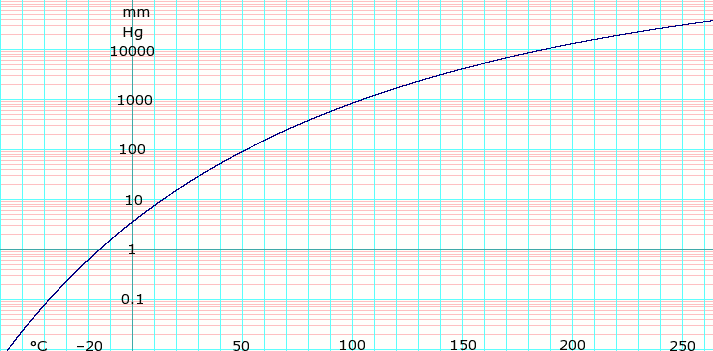
log_{10} of n-propanol vapor pressure. Uses formula: $\scriptstyle \log_e P_{mmHg} =$$\scriptstyle \log_e (\frac {760} {101.325}) - 7.702226 \log_e(T+273.15) - \frac {8002.693} {T+273.15} + 71.71697 + 3.950448 \times 10^{-07} (T+273.15)^2$ obtained from CHERIC

== Distillation data ==
Vapor-liquid Equilibrium for n-propanol/Water; P = 100 kPa
BP Temp. °C	% by mole water
BP Temp. °C	liquid	vapor
96.60	0.00	0.00
96.25	1.3	2.5
94.69	3.8	9.7
92.92	8.3	19.4
90.64	16.0	31.7
89.31	22.6	39.0
88.48	28.3	43.7
87.67	35.6	48.7
87.32	42.6	52.2
87.18	50.0	55.0
87.13	58.3	57.2
87.12	64.8	58.5
87.17	70.8	59.5
87.29	76.3	60.3
87.47	81.7	60.8
87.63	85.3	61.3
87.78	88.3	61.9
87.97	91.1	62.7
88.28	92.6	63.2
88.62	94.5	64.3
89.26	95.7	66.3
90.15	96.7	68.3
91.91	97.8	73.9
93.72	98.5	79.4
95.56	99.1	85.4
97.08	99.6	90.5
98.80	99.9	98.4
99.63	100.0	100.0

Vapor-liquid Equilibrium for n-propanol/Methanol; P = 760 mm Hg
BP Temp. °C	% by mole methanol
BP Temp. °C	liquid	vapor
92.30	9.2	23.5
88.88	18.0	41.2
83.90	28.0	56.2
82.53	32.0	61.0
80.25	38.0	67.5
78.15	45.9	75.3
74.46	58.1	83.2
74.42	58.3	83.5
71.28	68.0	88.8
69.40	76.4	92.8
68.30	82.2	94.0
67.08	86.2	95.5

Vapor-liquid Equilibrium for n-propanol/Butanone; P = 760 mm Hg
BP Temp. °C	% by mole butanone
BP Temp. °C	liquid	vapor
94.8	5.4	12.5
93.0	9.3	20.6
91.8	12.8	27.1
90.3	17.1	33.7
88.9	23.5	41.3
87.7	28.4	46.9
86.1	36.6	54.7
84.9	44.0	60.5
83.8	53.3	67.7
83.5	57.2	70.1
82.5	64.1	74.8
81.6	73.0	81.0
81.0	80.4	85.9
80.4	87.9	90.9
79.9	94.3	95.7

Vapor-liquid Equilibrium for n-propanol/Cyclohexane; P = 101.325 kPa
BP Temp. °C	% by mole cyclohexane
BP Temp. °C	liquid	vapor
80.42	100	100
77.42	96.46	88.36
76.40	95.27	85.29
75.71	93.97	83.35
75.18	91.59	80.91
74.92	89.52	79.43
74.59	86.19	77.89
74.40	80.52	76.29
74.33	78.11	75.69
74.29	75.91	75.13
74.27	74.19	74.75
74.28	71.43	74.30
74.33	68.00	73.70
74.43	64.26	72.87
74.49	61.21	72.20
74.77	54.09	70.71
75.23	48.00	69.53
75.59	41.10	67.48
76.78	33.29	64.73
77.72	28.53	62.71
79.12	23.01	59.03
81.11	17.35	53.39
82.69	14.44	49.70
84.90	10.73	42.87
86.64	8.44	38.28
89.34	4.75	28.90
90.65	3.60	24.39
91.88	2.70	19.94
92.85	2.13	16.06
93.44	1.64	13.64
97.0	0.0	0.0

Vapor-liquid Equilibrium for n-propanol/n-Hexane; P = 760 mm Hg
BP Temp. °C	% by mole n-propanol
BP Temp. °C	liquid	vapor
77.70	2.3	13.6
70.05	6.0	25.7
68.25	11.7	42.4
64.70	21.0	55.8
64.10	24.6	60.0
63.90	28.6	63.7
62.25	39.8	67.2
62.20	41.7	67.2
61.90	49.3	69.1
61.55	59.3	70.6
61.60	65.7	72.0
61.65	67.3	72.5
61.60	72.8	72.7
61.80	87.2	75.8
62.50	92.3	79.9
63.90	97.5	85.6

Vapor-liquid Equilibrium for n-propanol/Acetone; P = 760 mm Hg
BP Temp. °C	% by mole acetone
BP Temp. °C	liquid	vapor
86.55	10.80	40.31
78.35	24.17	63.36
72.65	35.55	74.32
68.50	47.42	81.76
65.00	60.74	87.74
62.85	71.29	91.51

== Spectral data ==
UV-Vis
λ_{max}	? nm
Extinction coefficient, ε	?
IR
Major absorption bands	? cm^{−1}
NMR
Proton NMR
Carbon-13 NMR
Other NMR data
MS
Masses of main fragments
