= Isopropylmagnesium chloride =

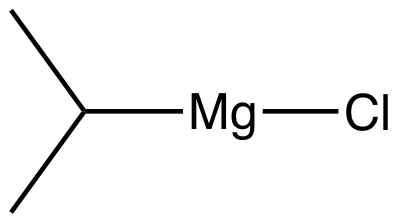

Identifiers
CAS Number	1068-55-9
3D model (JSmol)	Interactive image
ChemSpider	10620969
ECHA InfoCard	100.012.680
EC Number	213-947-1
PubChem CID	101955
UNII	MN8G5FEJ5J
CompTox Dashboard (EPA)	DTXSID6061444
- InChI: InChI=1S/C3H7.ClH.Mg/c1-3-2;;/h3H,1-2H3;1H;/q-1;;+2/p-1 Key: IUYHWZFSGMZEOG-UHFFFAOYSA-M
- SMILES: C[CH-]C.[Mg+2].[Cl-]

Properties
Chemical formula	C_{3}H_{7}ClMg
Molar mass	102.84 g·mol^{−1}
Solubility	Ethyl ether

Hazards
- GHS labelling
Pictograms	(GHS02: Flammable) (GHS05: Corrosive)
Signal word	Danger
Hazard statements	H225, H260, H314
Precautionary statements	P210, P223, P231+P232, P233, P240, P241, P242, P243, P260, P264, P280, P301+P330+P331, P303+P361+P353, P304+P340, P305+P351+P338, P310, P321, P335+P334, P363, P370+P378, P402+P404, P403+P235, P405, P501
- Except where otherwise noted, data are given for materials in their standard state (at 25 °C [77 °F], 100 kPa). Infobox references

Isopropylmagnesium chloride is an organometallic compound with the general formula (CH_{3})_{2}HCMgCl. This highly flammable, colorless, and moisture sensitive material is the Grignard reagent derived from isopropyl chloride. It is commercially available, usually as a solution in tetrahydrofuran.

== Synthesis and reactivity ==
Solutions of isopropylmagnesium chloride by treating isopropyl chloride with magnesium metal in refluxing ether:

(CH_{3})_{2}HCCl + Mg → (CH_{3})_{2}HCMgCl

This reagent is used to prepare other Grignard reagents by transmetalation. An illustrative reaction involves the generation of the Grignard reagent derived from bromo-3,5-bis(trifluoromethyl)benzene:

(CH_{3})_{2}HCMgCl + (CF_{3})_{2}C_{6}H_{3}Br → (CH_{3})_{2}HCCl + (CF_{3})_{2}C_{6}H_{3}MgBr

Addition of one equivalent of LiCl to isopropylmagnesium chloride gives "Turbo Grignard" solutions, named so due to the increased rate and efficiency for transmetalation reactions.

Isopropylmagnesium chloride is also used to prepare isopropyl compounds, such as chlorodiisopropylphosphine:

PCl_{3} + 2 (CH_{3})_{2}CHMgCl → [(CH_{3})_{2}CH]_{2}PCl + 2 MgCl_{2}

This reaction exploits the bulky nature of the isopropyl substituent.

== Turbo-Grignard reagents ==
As initially reported by Knochel et al., lithium chloride enhances the ability of isopropylmagnesium chloride toward transmetalation reactions. The more reactive species, a LiCl-iPrMgCl complex, is called a Turbo-Grignard reagent. These species are related to Turbo-Hauser bases, a family of magnesium amido compounds containing also LiCl. "Turbo-Grignards", as they are often called, are aggregates with the formula [i-PrMgCl·LiCl]_{2}. These species promote formation of aryl and heteroaryl Grignard reagents by halogen-magnesium exchange:

fast, homogeneous: XC_{6}H_{4}Br + i−PrMgCl·LiCl → XC_{6}H_{4}MgCl·LiCl + i−PrBr

The traditional method for generating the aryl Grignard reagent proceeds less predictably:

slow, heterogeneous: XC_{6}H_{4}Br + Mg → XC_{6}H_{4}MgBr

Furthermore, traditional routes to Grignard reagents has limited functional group compatibility, whereas the Turbo-Grignard method tolerates other halides, some ester groups, and nitriles.

Studies suggest that the enhanced reactivity towards electrophiles by "Turbo-Grignard" reagents in comparison to their "classic" equivalent can be attributed to a greater concentration of nucleophilic magnesate complexes in the solution due to the presence of LiCl.

== Structure and speciation ==
In ether solution, chloride-containing Grignard reagents consist of ether complexes, often as clusters such as R_{2}Mg_{4}Cl_{6}(THF)_{6}. In the case of the Turbo Grignard reagent, the cluster R_{2}Mg_{4}Cl_{6}(THF)_{6} was identified by X-ray crystallography.
