= Diisopropylmercury =

Chemical compound

- Skeletal formula of diisopropylmercury

Names
- Preferred IUPAC name Di(propan-2-yl)mercury
- Other names Bis(1-methylethyl)mercury

Identifiers
CAS Number	1071-39-2
3D model (JSmol)	Interactive image
ChemSpider	13445
PubChem CID	14064
CompTox Dashboard (EPA)	DTXSID50147914
- InChI: InChI=1S/2C3H7.Hg/c2*1-3-2;/h2*3H,1-2H3; Key: UVUGOJQWNVFTRT-UHFFFAOYSA-N
- SMILES: CC(C)[Hg]C(C)C

Properties
Chemical formula	C_{6}H_{14}Hg
Molar mass	286.770 g·mol^{−1}

Hazards
- Lethal dose or concentration (LD, LC)
LD_{Lo} (lowest published)	7800 μg/kg (intraperitoneal, rat)
- Except where otherwise noted, data are given for materials in their standard state (at 25 °C [77 °F], 100 kPa). Infobox references

Diisopropylmercury is an organomercury chemical compound with formula C_{6}H_{14}Hg. It may be prepared through a reaction between 2-bromopropane and mercury(II) chloride, catalyzed by magnesium. Decomposition of diisopropylmercury by addition of ozone yields a mixture of mercury(II) chloride, mercury(I) chloride, and mercury(II) oxide.
