= Ethyl iodide =

Skeletal formula of ethyl iodide
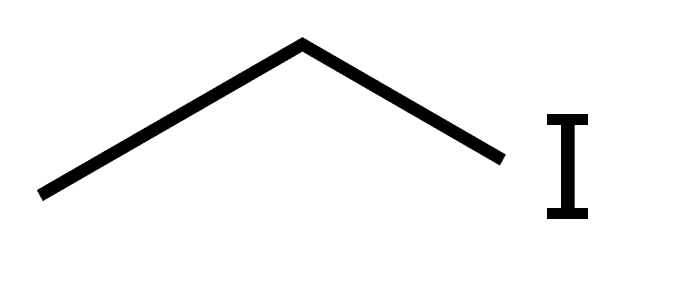

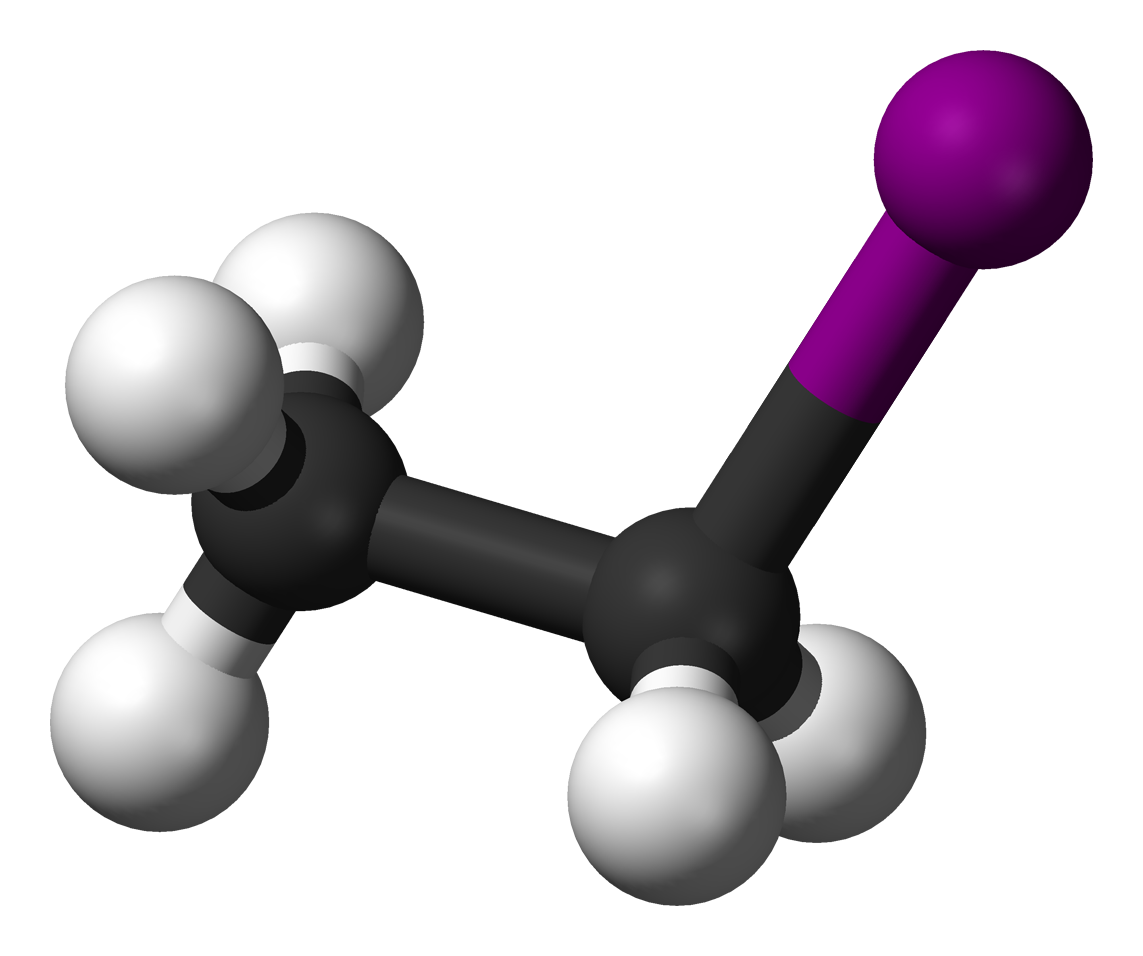
Ball and stick model of ethyl iodide
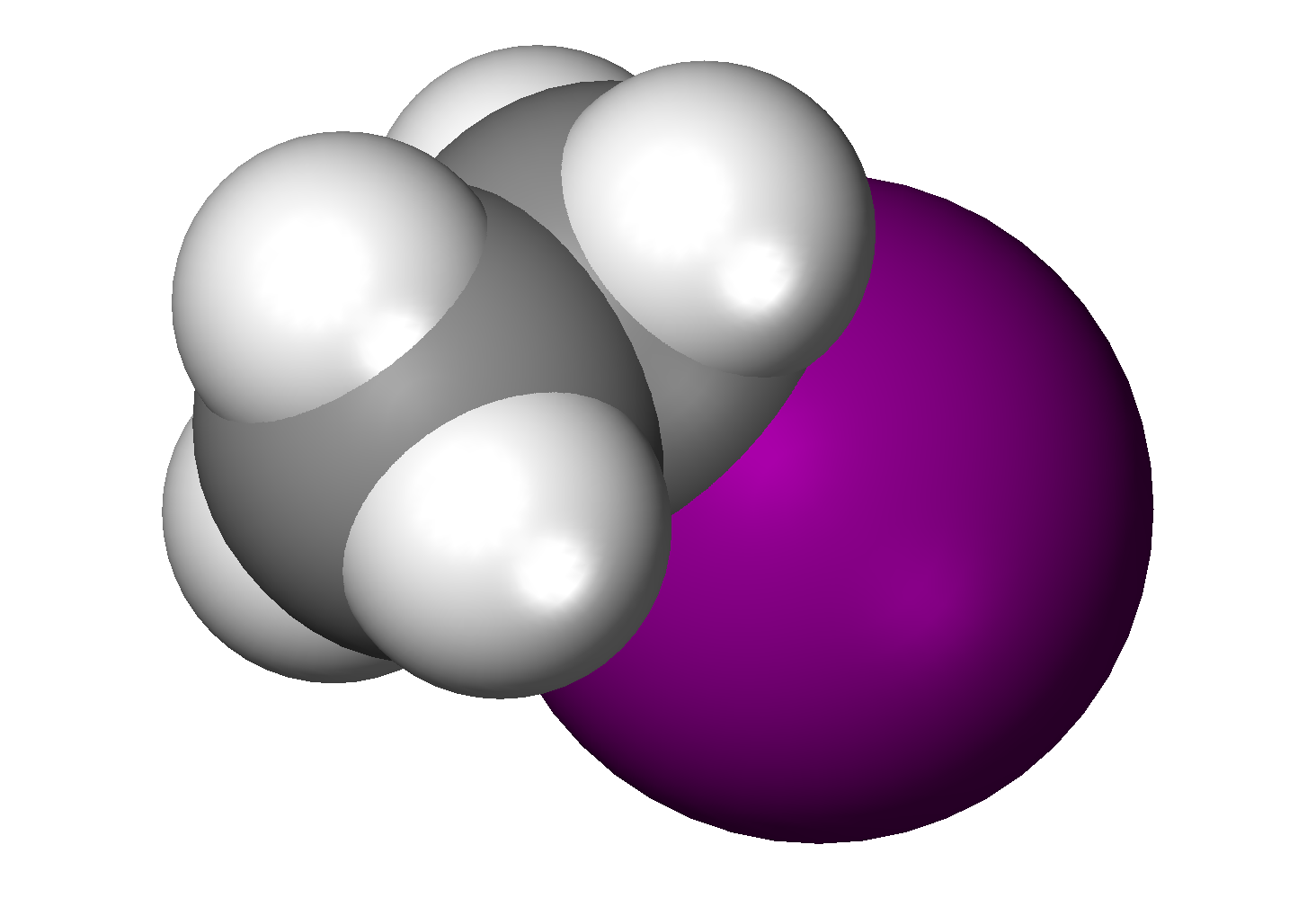
Spacefill model of ethyl iodide

Names
- Preferred IUPAC name Iodoethane

Identifiers
CAS Number	75-03-6
3D model (JSmol)	Interactive image
Abbreviations	EtI
Beilstein Reference	505934
ChEBI	CHEBI:42487
ChEMBL	ChEMBL1232588
ChemSpider	6100
ECHA InfoCard	100.000.758
EC Number	200-833-1
PubChem CID	6340
RTECS number	KI4750000
UNII	59PO05D39L
CompTox Dashboard (EPA)	DTXSID9058783
- InChI: InChI=1S/C2H5I/c1-2-3/h2H2,1H3 Key: HVTICUPFWKNHNG-UHFFFAOYSA-N
- SMILES: CCI

Properties
Chemical formula	C_{2}H_{5}I
Molar mass	155.966 g·mol^{−1}
Appearance	Colourless liquid
Density	1.940 g mL^{−1}
Melting point	−111.10 °C; −167.98 °F; 162.05 K
Boiling point	71.5 to 73.3 °C; 160.6 to 163.8 °F; 344.6 to 346.4 K
Solubility in water	4 g L^{−1} (at 20 °C)
Solubility in ethanol	Miscible
Solubility in diethyl ether	Miscible
log P	2.119
Vapor pressure	17.7 kPa
Henry's law constant (k_{H})	1.8 μmol Pa^{−1} kg^{−1}
Magnetic susceptibility (χ)	−69.7·10^{−6} cm^{3}/mol
Refractive index (n_{D})	1.513–1.514
Viscosity	5.925 mPa s (at 20 °C)

Thermochemistry
Heat capacity (C)	109.7 J K^{−1} mol^{−1}
Std enthalpy of formation (Δ_{f}H^{⦵}_{298})	−39.9 to −38.3 kJ mol^{−1}
Std enthalpy of combustion (Δ_{c}H^{⦵}_{298})	−1.4629 to −1.4621 MJ mol^{−1}

Hazards
- GHS labelling
Pictograms	(GHS07: Exclamation mark) (GHS08: Health hazard)
Signal word	Danger
Hazard statements	H302, H315, H317, H319, H334, H335
Precautionary statements	P261, P280, P305+P351+P338, P342+P311
NFPA 704 (fire diamond)	2 1 1
Flash point	72 °C (162 °F; 345 K)
- Lethal dose or concentration (LD, LC)
LD_{50} (median dose)	330 g m^{−3} (oral, rat)

Related compounds
Related iodoalkanes	Methyl iodide; Diiodomethane; Iodoform; Carbon tetraiodide; n-Propyl iodide; Isopropyl iodide
Related compounds	Pimagedine; Guanidine; Diiodohydroxypropane
- Except where otherwise noted, data are given for materials in their standard state (at 25 °C [77 °F], 100 kPa). verify (what is ?) Infobox references

Ethyl iodide (also iodoethane) is a colorless flammable chemical compound. It has the chemical formula C_{2}H_{5}I or CH_{3}CH_{2}I and is prepared by heating ethanol with iodine and phosphorus. On contact with air, especially on the effect of light, it decomposes and turns yellow or reddish from dissolved iodine.

It may also be prepared by the reaction between hydroiodic acid and ethanol, typically by generating the hydroiodic acid in situ via an iodide salt (such as sodium iodide) and an acid (such as sulfuric acid), after which the ethyl iodide is distilled off. Ethyl iodide should be stored in the presence of copper powder to avoid rapid decomposition, though even with this method samples do not last more than 1 year.

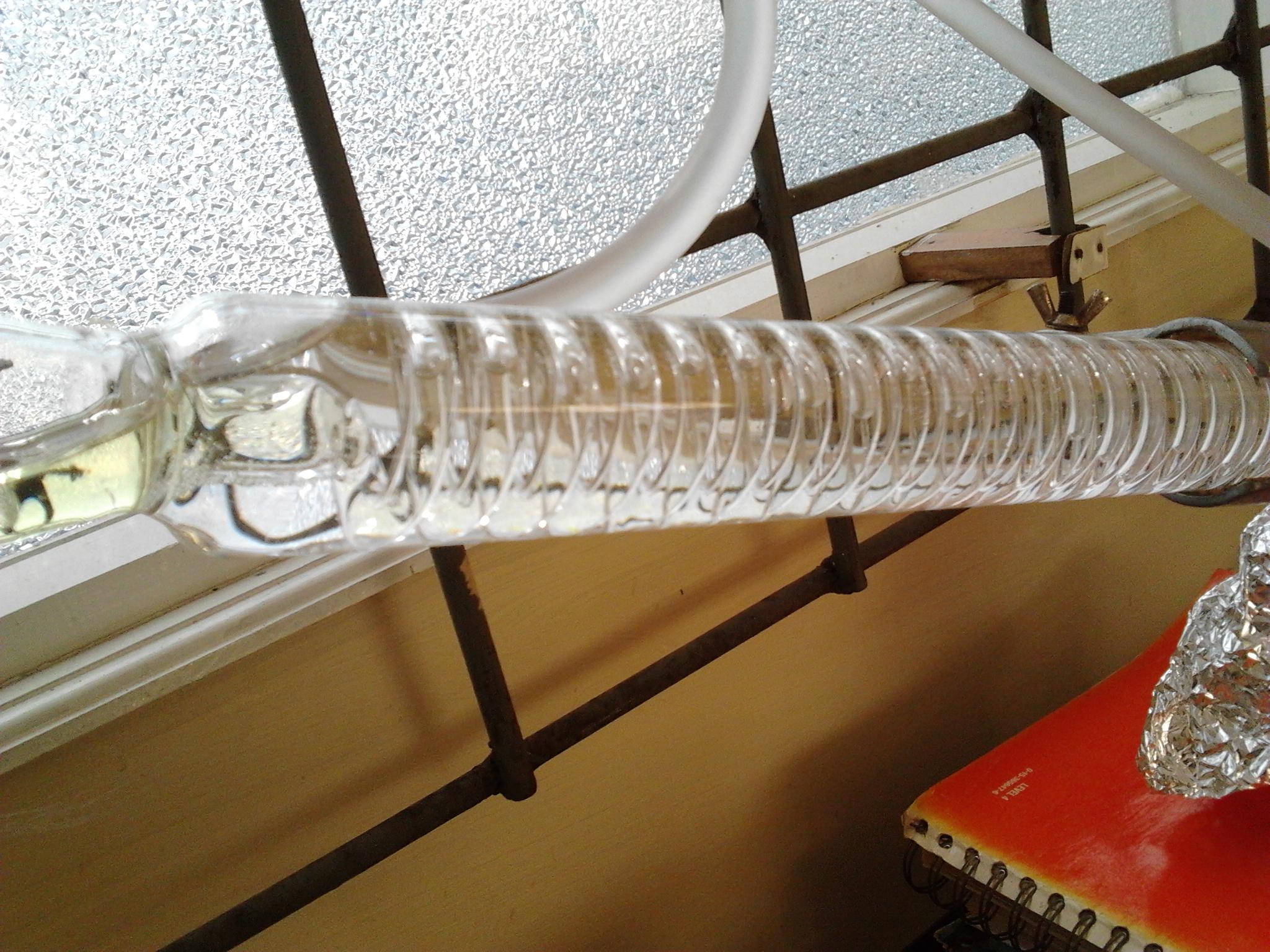
Ethyl iodide distillation. It has a greenish color due to decomposition.

Because iodide is a good leaving group, ethyl iodide is an excellent ethylating agent. It is also used as the hydrogen radical promoter.

== Production ==
Ethyl iodide is prepared by using red phosphorus, absolute ethanol and iodine. The iodine dissolves in the ethanol, where it reacts with the solid phosphorus to form phosphorus triiodide. During this process, the temperature is controlled.

3 C_{2}H_{5}OH + PI_{3} → 3 C_{2}H_{5}I + H_{3}PO_{3}

The crude product is purified by distillation.
