= Isopropyl acetate =

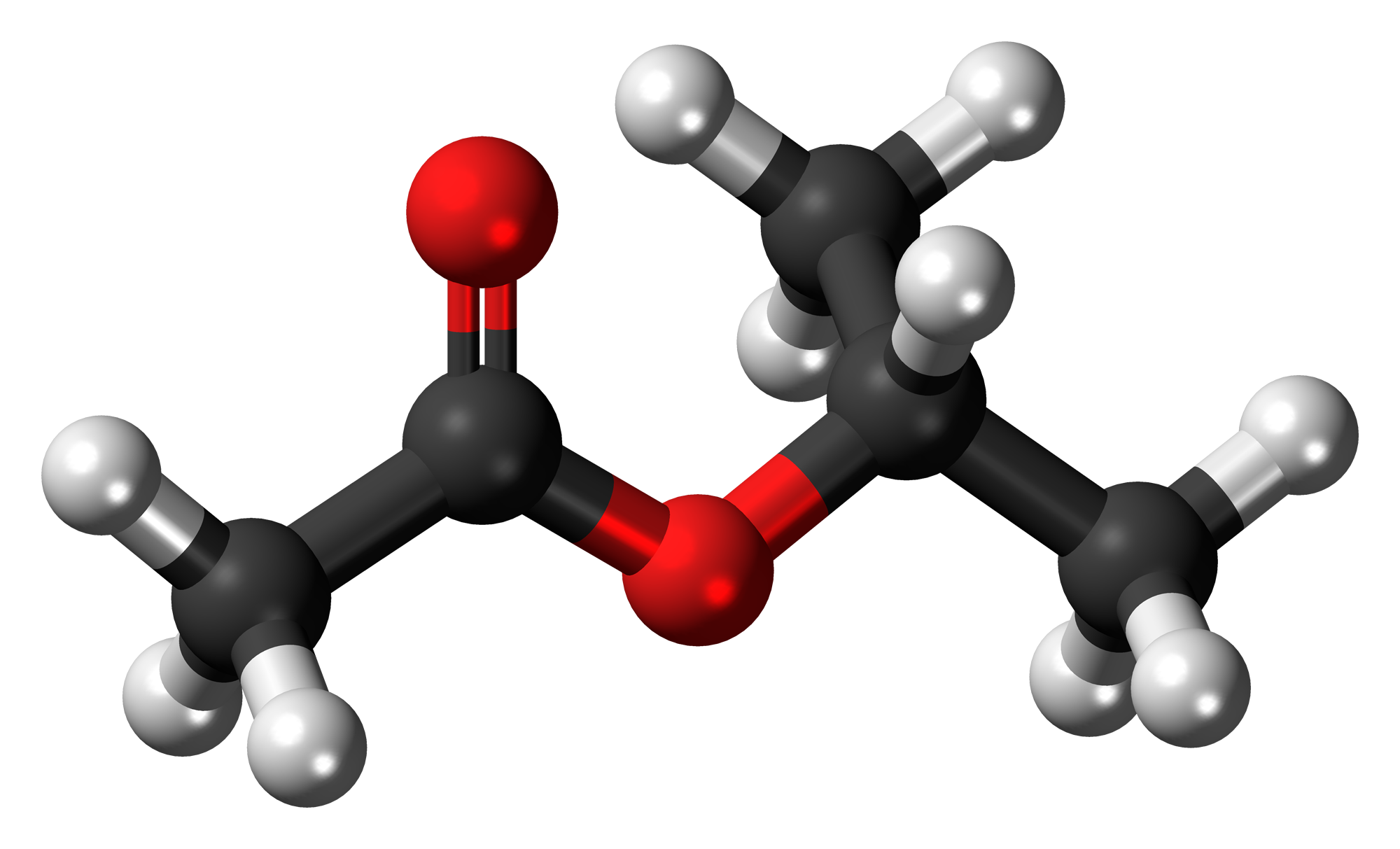

Names
- IUPAC name Propan-2-yl acetate
- Systematic IUPAC name Propan-2-yl ethanoate
- Other names Isopropyl acetate 2-Acetoxypropane; 2-Propyl acetate 2-Propyl ethanoate Propan-2-yl ethanoate

Identifiers
CAS Number	108-21-4
3D model (JSmol)	Interactive image
ChEMBL	ChEMBL1608674
ChemSpider	7627
ECHA InfoCard	100.003.238
EC Number	203-561-1
PubChem CID	7915
RTECS number	AI4930000
UNII	1Y67AFK870
UN number	1220
CompTox Dashboard (EPA)	DTXSID2025478
- InChI: InChI=1S/C5H10O2/c1-4(2)7-5(3)6/h4H,1-3H3 Key: JMMWKPVZQRWMSS-UHFFFAOYSA-N; InChI=1/C5H10O2/c1-4(2)7-5(3)6/h4H,1-3H3 Key: JMMWKPVZQRWMSS-UHFFFAOYAA
- SMILES: CC(OC(C)C)=O

Properties
Chemical formula	C_{5}H_{10}O_{2}
Molar mass	102.133 g·mol^{−1}
Density	0.87 g/cm^{3}
Melting point	−73 °C (−99 °F; 200 K)
Boiling point	89 °C (192 °F; 362 K)
Solubility in water	4.3 g/100 mL (27 °C), 3.0 g/100 mL (20 °C)
Vapor pressure	42 mmHg (20 °C)
Magnetic susceptibility (χ)	−67.04·10^{−6} cm^{3}/mol

Hazards
- GHS labelling
Pictograms	(GHS02: Flammable) (GHS07: Exclamation mark)
Signal word	Danger
Hazard statements	H225, H319, H336
Precautionary statements	P210, P233, P240, P241, P242, P243, P261, P264, P271, P280, P303+P361+P353, P304+P340, P305+P351+P338, P312, P337+P313, P370+P378, P403+P233, P403+P235, P405, P501
NFPA 704 (fire diamond)	1 3
Flash point	2 °C (36 °F; 275 K)
Autoignition temperature	460 °C (860 °F; 733 K)
Explosive limits	1.8–7.8%
- Lethal dose or concentration (LD, LC)
LC_{50} (median concentration)	11,918 ppm (rat, 8 hr)
- NIOSH (US health exposure limits)
PEL (Permissible)	TWA 250 ppm (950 mg/m^{3})
REL (Recommended)	None established
IDLH (Immediate danger)	1800 ppm
- Except where otherwise noted, data are given for materials in their standard state (at 25 °C [77 °F], 100 kPa). verify (what is ?) Infobox references

Isopropyl acetate (commonly abbreviated IPAc or iPrOAc) is an ester, an organic compound which is the product of esterification of acetic acid and isopropanol. It is a clear, colorless liquid with a characteristic fruity odour.

Isopropyl acetate is a solvent with a wide variety of manufacturing uses that is miscible with most other organic solvents and is slightly soluble in water (2.9 wt% at 20 °C), though less so than ethyl acetate. Inversely, water is also slightly soluble in isopropyl acetate (1.8 wt% at 20 °C). Isopropyl acetate forms an azeotrope with water, allowing for anhydrous solutions to be easily achieved through evaporation with an azeotrope composition of 88.9 wt% isopropyl acetate. It is used as a solvent for cellulose, plastics, oil and fats. It is a component of some printing inks and perfumes.

Isopropyl acetate decomposes slowly on contact with steel in the presence of air, producing acetic acid and isopropanol. It reacts violently with oxidizing materials and it attacks many plastics.

Isopropyl acetate is quite flammable in both its liquid and vapor forms, and it may be harmful if swallowed or inhaled.

The Occupational Safety and Health Administration has set a permissible exposure limit (PEL) of 250 ppm (950 mg/m^{3}) over an eight-hour time-weighted average for workers handling isopropyl acetate.
