= Isopropyl chloride =

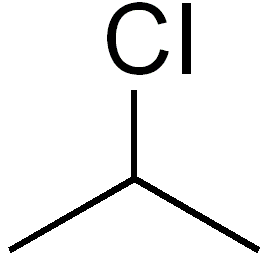
Skeletal formula
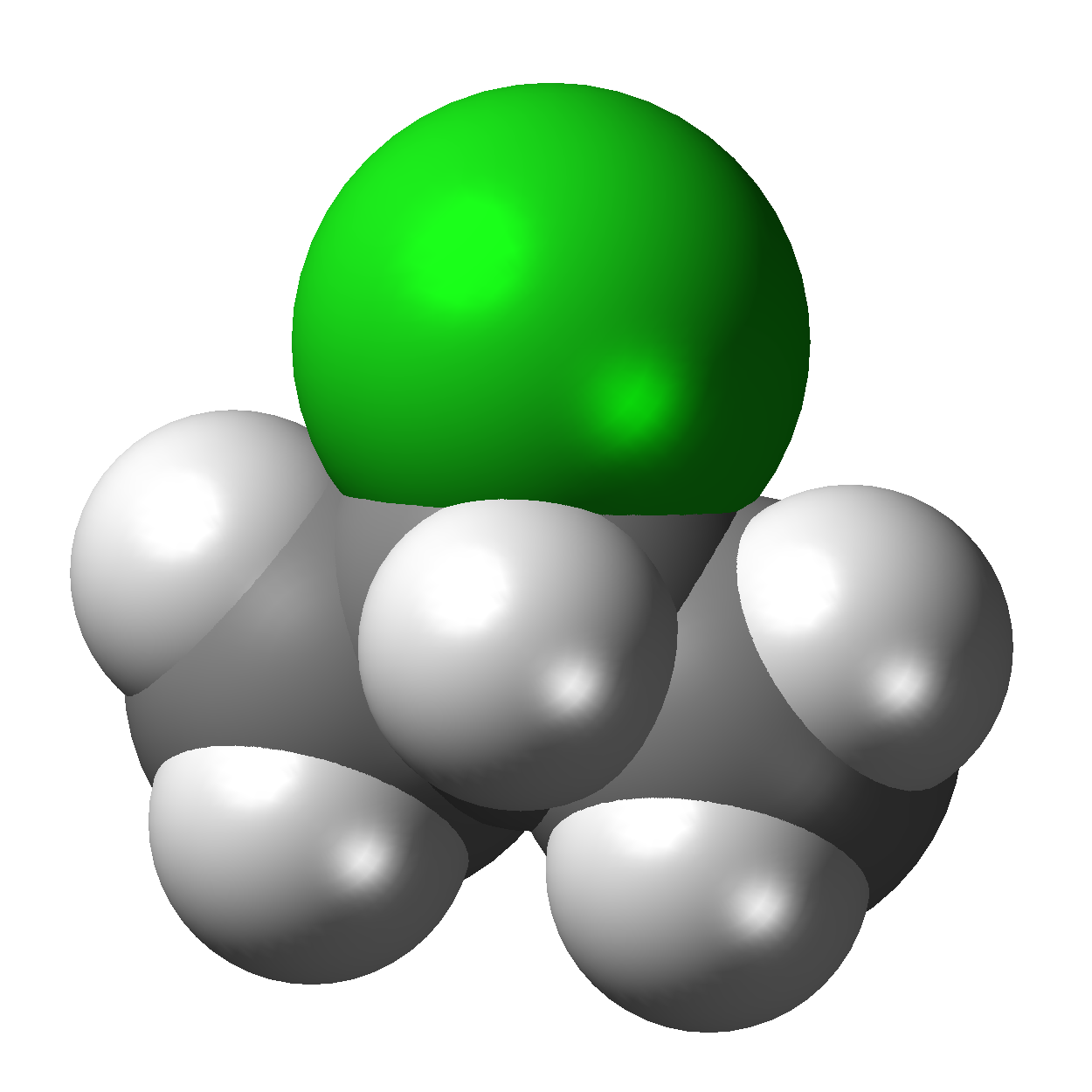
Space-filling model

Names
- Preferred IUPAC name 2-Chloropropane
- Other names Chlorodimethylmethane, isopropyl chloride, 2-propyl chloride, sec-propyl chloride, 2-chloropropane

Identifiers
| CAS Number | 75-29-6 |
| 3D model (JSmol) | Interactive image |
| Abbreviations | i-PrCl iPrCl^{i}PrCl |
| ChemSpider | 6121 |
| ECHA InfoCard | 100.000.781 |
| EC Number | 200-858-8 |
| PubChem CID | 6361 |
| RTECS number | TX4410000 |
| UNII | VU39J8AJ2N |
| UN number | 2356 |
| CompTox Dashboard (EPA) | DTXSID6047739 |
- InChI: InChI=1S/C3H7Cl/c1-3(2)4/h3H,1-2H3 Key: ULYZAYCEDJDHCC-UHFFFAOYSA-N; InChI=1/C3H7Cl/c1-3(2)4/h3H,1-2H3 Key: ULYZAYCEDJDHCC-UHFFFAOYAB
- SMILES: CC(Cl)C

Properties
| Chemical formula | C_{3}H_{7}Cl |
| Molar mass | 78.54 g·mol^{−1} |
| Appearance | Colorless liquid |
| Odor | sweet, ether-like |
| Density | 0.862 |
| Melting point | −117.18 °C (−178.92 °F; 155.97 K) |
| Boiling point | 35.74 °C (96.33 °F; 308.89 K) |
| Solubility in water | 0.334 g/100 ml at 12.5 °C |
| Solubility in ethanol | miscible |
| Solubility in diethyl ether | miscible |
| Refractive index (n_{D}) | 1.3811 |
| Viscosity | 4.05 cP at 0 °C; 3.589 cP at 20 °C |

Hazards
- Occupational safety and health (OHS/OSH)
| Main hazards | Highly flammable, possible mutagen. May be harmful by ingestion, inhalation or through skin contact. |
- GHS labelling
| Pictograms | (GHS02: Flammable) (GHS07: Exclamation mark) |
| Signal word | Danger |
| Hazard statements | H225, H302, H312, H332 |
| Precautionary statements | P210, P233, P240, P241, P242, P243, P261, P264, P270, P271, P280, P301+P312, P302+P352, P303+P361+P353, P304+P312, P304+P340, P312, P322, P330, P363, P370+P378, P403+P235, P501 |
| NFPA 704 (fire diamond) | 2 4 0 |
| Flash point | −32 °C (−26 °F; 241 K) |
| Safety data sheet (SDS) | External MSDS |

Related compounds
| Related alkyl halides | Ethyl chloride n-propyl chloride Isopropyl bromide Isopropyl iodide |
- Except where otherwise noted, data are given for materials in their standard state (at 25 °C [77 °F], 100 kPa). verify (what is ?) Infobox references

Isopropyl chloride is an organic compound with the chemical formula C_{3}H_{7}Cl, (CH_{3})_{2}CHCl or CH_{3}CHClCH_{3}. It is a colourless to slightly yellow, volatile, flammable liquid with a sweet, ether-like (almost like petroleum) odour. It is used as an industrial solvent.

It is produced industrially by the addition of HCl to propylene:

CH_{3}CH=CH_{2} + HCl → (CH_{3})_{2}CHCl

Isopropyl chloride can be easily produced in the lab by reacting concentrated hydrochloric acid with isopropyl alcohol in the presence of a calcium chloride or zinc chloride catalyst. The common ratio of alcohol to acid to catalyst is 1:2:1 using 30% HCl and near pure isopropyl alcohol. The reaction mixture is refluxed for several hours, or distilled over several hours. The isopropyl chloride is then separated from the remaining isopropyl alcohol by washing with water (the isopropyl chloride will form in insoluble layer above the water, while the alcohol will dissolve into solution along with any HCl present).

In the presence of a catalyst, dry isopropyl chloride reacts with magnesium to give isopropylmagnesium chloride.

When burned, isopropyl chloride releases copious amounts of hydrogen chloride gas, water vapor, carbon oxides, and some soot. It burns inefficiently with a smoky, yellowish flame.
