= Isopropyl iodide =

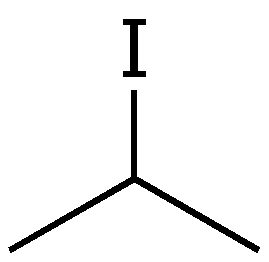
- Structural formula of isopropyl iodide

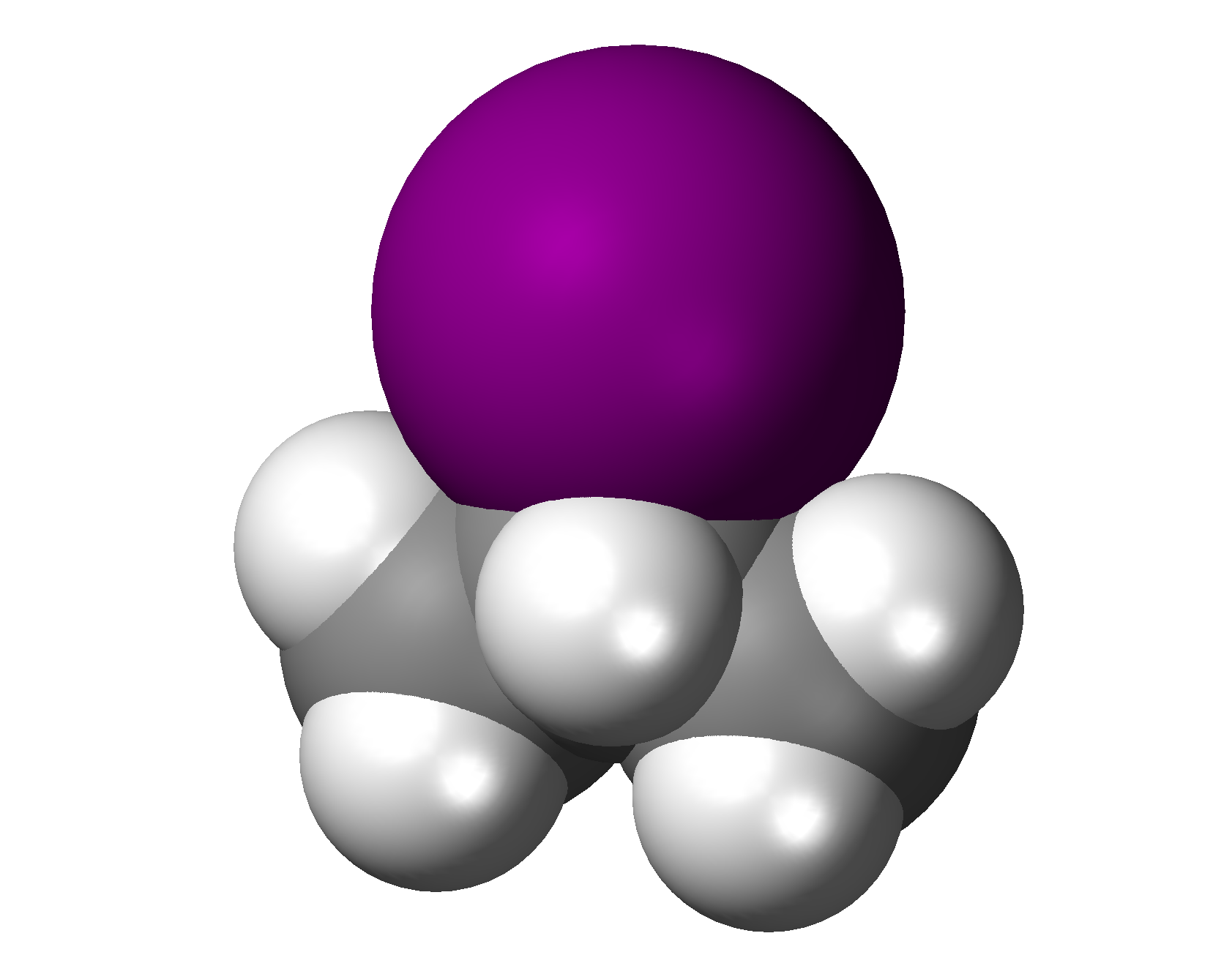
- Space-filling model of isopropyl iodide

Names
- Preferred IUPAC name 2-Iodopropane

Identifiers
CAS Number	75-30-9
3D model (JSmol)	Interactive image
Abbreviations	2-IP i-PrI iPrI^{i}PrI
Beilstein Reference	1098244
ChemSpider	6122
ECHA InfoCard	100.000.782
EC Number	200-859-3
MeSH	isopropyl+iodide
PubChem CID	6362
RTECS number	TZ4200000
UNII	67K05OPZ0E
UN number	2392
CompTox Dashboard (EPA)	DTXSID4058788
- InChI: InChI=1S/C3H7I/c1-3(2)4/h3H,1-2H3 Key: FMKOJHQHASLBPH-UHFFFAOYSA-N
- SMILES: CC(C)I

Properties
Chemical formula	C_{3}H_{7}I
Molar mass	169.993 g·mol^{−1}
Appearance	Colourless liquid
Density	1.703 g mL^{−1}
Melting point	−90.00 °C; −130.00 °F; 183.15 K
Boiling point	88.8 to 89.8 °C; 191.7 to 193.5 °F; 361.9 to 362.9 K
Solubility in water	1.4 g L^{−1} (at 12.5 °C)
Solubility in chloroform	Miscible
Solubility in ethanol	Miscible
Solubility in diethyl ether	Miscible
Solubility in benzene	Miscible
Henry's law constant (k_{H})	890 nmol Pa^{−1} kg^{−1}
Refractive index (n_{D})	1.4997
Viscosity	6.971 mPa (at 20 °C)

Thermochemistry
Heat capacity (C)	137.3 J K^{−1} mol^{−1}
Std enthalpy of formation (Δ_{f}H^{⦵}_{298})	−77.2–−72.6 kJ mol^{−1}

Hazards
- GHS labelling
Pictograms	(GHS02: Flammable) (GHS07: Exclamation mark)
Signal word	Warning
Hazard statements	H226, H302
Flash point	42 °C (108 °F; 315 K)

Related compounds
Related alkanes	Ethane; Ethyl iodide; Propane; n-Propyl iodide; Butane; Butyl iodide
Related compounds	Diiodohydroxypropane
- Except where otherwise noted, data are given for materials in their standard state (at 25 °C [77 °F], 100 kPa). verify (what is ?) Infobox references

Isopropyl iodide is the organoiodine compound with the formula (CH_{3})_{2}CHI. It is colorless, flammable, and volatile. Organic iodides are light-sensitive and take on a yellow colour upon storage, owing to the formation of iodine.

== Preparation ==
Isopropyl iodide is prepared by iodination of isopropyl alcohol using hydrogen iodide or, equivalently, with a mixture of glycerol, iodine, and phosphorus. An alternative preparation involves the reaction of 2-propyl bromide with an acetone solution of sodium iodide (Finkelstein reaction):

(CH_{3})_{2}CHBr + NaI → (CH_{3})_{2}CHI + NaBr
