= 1-Propanol =

Primary alcohol compound (CH3CH2CH2OH)

- Skeletal formula of 1-propanol

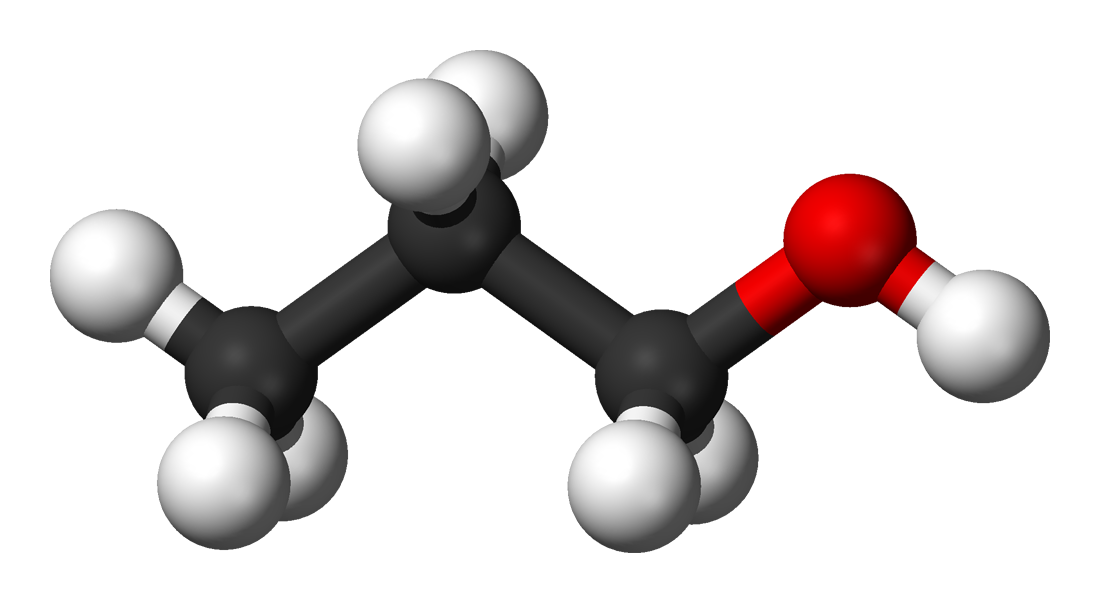
- Ball and stick model of 1-propanol

Names
Pronunciation	/ˈwən.prəʊpənɒlˈ/
- Preferred IUPAC name Propan-1-ol
- Other names: n-Propyl alcohol; n-Propanol; Ethyl carbinol; 1-Hydroxypropane; Propionic alcohol; Propionyl alcohol; Propionylol; Propyl alcohol; Propylic alcohol; Propylol

Identifiers
CAS Number	71-23-8
3D model (JSmol)	Interactive image
Abbreviations	PrOH n-PrOH nPrOH^{n}PrOH
Beilstein Reference	1098242
ChEBI	CHEBI:28831
ChEMBL	ChEMBL14687
ChemSpider	1004
DrugBank	DB03175
ECHA InfoCard	100.000.679
EC Number	200-746-9
Gmelin Reference	25616
KEGG	C05979
MeSH	1-Propanol
PubChem CID	1031
RTECS number	UH8225000
UNII	96F264O9SV
UN number	1274
CompTox Dashboard (EPA)	DTXSID2021739
- InChI: InChI=1S/C3H7OH/c1-2-3-4/h4H,2-3H2,1H3 Key: BDERNNFJNOPAEC-UHFFFAOYSA-N
- SMILES: CCCO

Properties
Chemical formula	C_{3}H_{8}O
Molar mass	60.096 g·mol^{−1}
Appearance	Colorless liquid
Odor	mild, alcohol-like
Density	0.803 g/mL
Melting point	−126 °C; −195 °F; 147 K
Boiling point	97 to 98 °C; 206 to 208 °F; 370 to 371 K
Solubility in water	miscible
log P	0.329
Vapor pressure	1.99 kPa (at 20 °C)
Acidity (pK_{a})	16
Basicity (pK_{b})	−2
Magnetic susceptibility (χ)	−45.176·10^{−6} cm^{3}/mol
Refractive index (n_{D})	1.387
Viscosity	1.959 mPa·s (at 25 °C)
Dipole moment	1.68 D

Thermochemistry
Heat capacity (C)	143.96 J/(K·mol)
Std molar entropy (S^{⦵}_{298})	192.8 J/(K·mol)
Std enthalpy of formation (Δ_{f}H^{⦵}_{298})	−302.79…−302.29 kJ/mol
Std enthalpy of combustion (Δ_{c}H^{⦵}_{298})	−2.02156…−2.02106 MJ/mol

Pharmacology
ATC code	D08AX03 (WHO)

Hazards
- Occupational safety and health (OHS/OSH)
Main hazards	Flammable liquid
- GHS labelling
Pictograms	(GHS02: Flammable) (GHS07: Exclamation mark)
Signal word	Danger
Hazard statements	H225, H302, H318, H336
Precautionary statements	P210, P261, P280, P305+P351+P338
NFPA 704 (fire diamond)	1 3 0
Flash point	22 °C (72 °F; 295 K)
Autoignition temperature	371 °C (700 °F; 644 K)
Explosive limits	2.2–13.7%
- Lethal dose or concentration (LD, LC)
LD_{50} (median dose)	2800 mg/kg (rabbit, oral); 1699 mg/kg (mouse, oral); 1870 mg/kg (rat, oral)
- NIOSH (US health exposure limits)
PEL (Permissible)	TWA 200 ppm (500 mg/m^{3})
REL (Recommended)	TWA 200 ppm (500 mg/m^{3}) ST 250 ppm (625 mg/m^{3}) [skin]
IDLH (Immediate danger)	800 ppm

Related compounds
Related compounds	Propane; Isopropyl alcohol Propanamine; Ethanol; Butanol

Supplementary data page
- 1-Propanol (data page)
- Except where otherwise noted, data are given for materials in their standard state (at 25 °C [77 °F], 100 kPa). verify (what is ?) Infobox references

1-propanol (also propan-1-ol, propanol, n-propyl alcohol) is a primary alcohol with the formula CH_{3}CH_{2}CH_{2}OH and sometimes represented as PrOH or n-PrOH. It is a colourless liquid and an isomer of 2-propanol. 1-Propanol is used as a solvent in the pharmaceutical industry, mainly for resins and cellulose esters, and, sometimes, as a disinfecting agent.

== History ==
The compound was discovered by Gustave Chancel in 1853 by fractional distillation of fusel oil. He measured its boiling point at 96°C, correctly identified its empirical formula, studied some of its chemical properties and gave it two names: propionic alcohol and hydrate of trityl.

After several unsuccessful attempts, it was synthesized independently and by two different routes by Eduard Linnemann and Carl Schorlemmer in 1868.

== Occurrence ==
Fusel alcohols like 1-propanol are grain fermentation byproducts, and therefore trace amounts of 1-propanol are present in many alcoholic beverages.

== Chemical properties ==
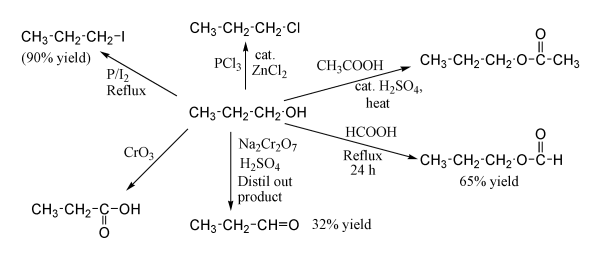
Some example reactions of 1-propanol

1-Propanol shows the normal reactions of a primary alcohol. Thus it can be converted to alkyl halides; for example red phosphorus and iodine produce n-propyl iodide in 80% yield, while PCl_{3} with catalytic ZnCl_{2} gives n-propyl chloride. Reaction with acetic acid in the presence of an H_{2}SO_{4} catalyst under Fischer esterification conditions gives propyl acetate, while refluxing propanol overnight with formic acid alone can produce propyl formate in 65% yield.

Oxidation of 1-propanol with Na_{2}Cr_{2}O_{7} and H_{2}SO_{4} gives a 36% yield of propionaldehyde, and therefore for this type of reaction higher yielding methods using PCC or the Swern oxidation are recommended. Oxidation with chromic acid yields propionic acid.

== Preparation ==
1-Propanol is manufactured by catalytic hydrogenation of propionaldehyde. Propionaldehyde is produced via the oxo process by hydroformylation of ethylene using carbon monoxide and hydrogen in the presence of a catalyst such as cobalt octacarbonyl or a rhodium complex.

H_{2}C=CH_{2} + CO + H_{2} → CH_{3}CH_{2}CH=O
CH_{3}CH_{2}CH=O + H_{2} → CH_{3}CH_{2}CH_{2}OH

Other proposed industrial processes include the two-step isomerization and hydrogenation of propylene oxide.

A traditional laboratory preparation of 1-propanol involves treating n-propyl iodide with moist Ag_{2}O.

1-Propanol can be prepared via the hydrogenation of acrolein with metal catalysts.

== Safety ==
1-Propanol is thought to be similar to ethanol in its effects on the human body, but 2 to 4 times more potent according to a study conducted on rabbits. Many toxicology studies find oral acute LD_{50} ranging from 1.9 g/kg to 6.5 g/kg (compared to 7.06 g/kg for ethanol). It is metabolized into propionic acid. Effects include alcoholic intoxication and high anion gap metabolic acidosis. As of 2011, one case of lethal poisoning was reported following oral ingestion of 500mL of 1-propanol. Due to a lack of long term data, the carcinogenicity of 1-propanol in humans is unknown.

== 1-Propanol as fuel ==
1-Propanol has a high octane number and is suitable for use as engine fuel. However, propanol is too expensive to use as a motor fuel. The research octane number (RON) of propanol is 118, and the anti-knock index (AKI) is 108.
