= Diiodohydroxypropane =

- Skeletal formula of diiodohydroxypropane

Names
- Preferred IUPAC name 1,3-Diiodopropan-2-ol

Identifiers
CAS Number	534-08-7
3D model (JSmol)	Interactive image
ChemSpider	61592
ECHA InfoCard	100.007.807
EC Number	208-586-1
MeSH	1,3-diiodo-2-propanol
PubChem CID	68295
UNII	1Z11279H67
CompTox Dashboard (EPA)	DTXSID8074992
- InChI: InChI=1S/C3H6I2O/c4-1-3(6)2-5/h3,6H,1-2H2 Key: DNKPFCQEGBJJTE-UHFFFAOYSA-N
- SMILES: OC(CI)CI

Properties
Chemical formula	C_{3}H_{6}I_{2}O
Molar mass	311.889 g·mol^{−1}

Pharmacology
ATC code	D08AG04 (WHO)

Related compounds
Related compounds	Isopropanol; n-Propyl iodide
- Except where otherwise noted, data are given for materials in their standard state (at 25 °C [77 °F], 100 kPa). verify (what is ?) Infobox references

Diiodohydroxypropane is an antiseptic and disinfectant. It is also known as jothion or iothion.
