= Cyclopentyl methyl ether =

- Chemical structure of cyclopentyl methyl ether

Names
- Preferred IUPAC name Methoxycyclopentane
- Other names CPME

Identifiers
CAS Number	5614-37-9
3D model (JSmol)	Interactive image
ChemSpider	122157
ECHA InfoCard	100.104.006
EC Number	445-090-6
PubChem CID	138539
UNII	4067E5GBKB
CompTox Dashboard (EPA)	DTXSID2074958
- InChI: InChI=1S/C6H12O/c1-7-6-4-2-3-5-6/h6H,2-5H2,1H3 Key: SKTCDJAMAYNROS-UHFFFAOYSA-N
- SMILES: COC1CCCC1

Properties
Chemical formula	C_{6}H_{12}O
Molar mass	100.161 g·mol^{−1}
Appearance	Colorless clear liquid
Density	0.8630 g/cm^{3} (20 °C)
Melting point	−140 °C (−220 °F; 133 K)
Boiling point	106 °C (223 °F; 379 K)
Solubility in water	0.011 g/g

Hazards
- GHS labelling
Pictograms	(GHS02: Flammable) (GHS07: Exclamation mark)
Signal word	Danger
Hazard statements	H225, H302, H312, H315, H319
Precautionary statements	P210, P233, P240, P241, P242, P243, P264, P270, P280, P301+P312, P302+P352, P303+P361+P353, P305+P351+P338, P312, P321, P322, P330, P332+P313, P337+P313, P362, P363, P370+P378, P403+P235, P501
NFPA 704 (fire diamond)	2 3 0
Flash point	−1 °C (30 °F; 272 K)
Safety data sheet (SDS)	MSDS
- Except where otherwise noted, data are given for materials in their standard state (at 25 °C [77 °F], 100 kPa). verify (what is ?) Infobox references

Cyclopentyl methyl ether (CPME), also known as methoxycyclopentane, is a hydrophobic ether solvent. A high boiling point of 106 °C (223 °F) and preferable characteristics such as low formation of peroxides, relative stability under acidic and basic conditions, formation of azeotropes with water coupled with a narrow explosion range render CPME an attractive alternative to other ethereal solvents such as tetrahydrofuran (THF), 2-methyltetrahydrofuran (2-MeTHF), dioxane, and 1,2-dimethoxyethane (DME).

== Synthesis ==
Cyclopentyl methyl ether is prepared by the addition of methanol to the cyclopentene catalyzed by various solid acids.

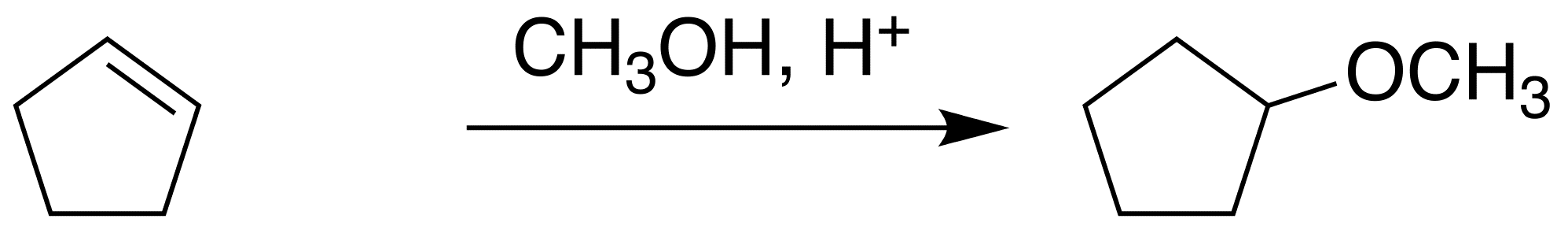

== Applications ==
Cyclopentyl methyl ether could as a solvent for extraction, polymerization, crystallization and surface coating.

Some examples of reactions where it acts as a solvent are:

- Reactions involving alkali agents: nucleophilic substitutions of heteroatoms (alcohols and amines)
- Lewis acids-mediated reactions: Beckmann Reaction, Friedel-Crafts Reaction etc.
- Reactions using Organometallic reagents or basic agents: Claisen condensation, formation of enolates or Grignard reaction.
- Reduction and oxidation.
- Reactions with transition metal catalysts.
- Reactions with azeotropical removal of water: acetalization, etc.

Cyclopentyl methyl ether possesses characteristics that make it a potential alternate for other ethers. According to an evaluation of three chemistry journals from 2020, ethereal solvents have a share of 22–25% of all solvents employed.

In contrast to water-soluble ethers like tetrahydrofuran and 1,4-dioxane, cyclopentyl methyl ether (CPME) - being hydrophobic - acts suitably as an extractant. In aqueous phases, only trace amounts of CPME remain due to its low solubility. CPME also exhibits stability at both low and high pH levels, even under elevated temperatures and extended contact times. It can form an azeotrope with water in a ratio of 83.7% CPME to 16.3% water at an azeotropic end temperature of 83 °C. These properties enable CPME to function effectively as an entrainer during esterification processes and acetalizations. The solvent also displays low solubility for water in CPME, reported to be 0.3 g / 100 g.

Cyclopentyl methyl ether is touted as an eco-friendly solvent in a wide range of still other processes, such as reductions, oxidations, and Grignard reactions.
