= 2-Methyltetrahydrofuran =

Names
- Preferred IUPAC name 2-Methyloxolane
- Other names 2-Methyltetrahydrofuran, 2-Methyl-THF

Identifiers
CAS Number	(Racemic): 96-47-9; (R): 63798-13-0; (S): 63798-12-9
3D model (JSmol)	(Racemic): Interactive image
ChEMBL	(Racemic): ChEMBL1580503
ChemSpider	(Racemic): 7028
ECHA InfoCard	100.002.281
EC Number	(Racemic): 202-507-4
PubChem CID	(Racemic): 7301
UNII	(Racemic): FCD0VD8ALF
UN number	2536
CompTox Dashboard (EPA)	(Racemic): DTXSID9030258
- InChI: InChI=1S/C5H10O/c1-5-3-2-4-6-5/h5H,2-4H2,1H3 Key: JWUJQDFVADABEY-UHFFFAOYSA-N; (Racemic): InChI=1/C5H10O/c1-5-3-2-4-6-5/h5H,2-4H2,1H3 Key: JWUJQDFVADABEY-UHFFFAOYAM
- SMILES: (Racemic): O1C(C)CCC1

Properties
Chemical formula	C_{5}H_{10}O
Molar mass	86.134 g·mol^{−1}
Density	0.854 g/mL
Melting point	−136 °C (−213 °F; 137 K)
Boiling point	80.2 °C (176.4 °F; 353.3 K)
Solubility in water	21.0 wt% (0.0 °C); 17.8 wt% (9.5 °C); 14.4 wt% (19.3 °C); 11.4 wt% (29.5 °C); 9.2 wt% (39.6 °C); 7.8 wt% (50.1 °C); 6.6 wt%(60.7 °C); 6.0 wt% (70.6 °C)

Hazards
- GHS labelling
Pictograms	(GHS02: Flammable) (GHS05: Corrosive) (GHS07: Exclamation mark)
Signal word	Warning
Hazard statements	H225, H302, H315, H318, H319, H335, H336
Precautionary statements	P210, P233, P240, P241, P242, P243, P261, P264, P270, P271, P280, P301+P312, P302+P352, P303+P361+P353, P304+P340, P305+P351+P338, P310, P312, P321, P330, P332+P313, P337+P313, P362, P370+P378, P403+P233, P403+P235, P405, P501
Safety data sheet (SDS)	External MSDS
- Except where otherwise noted, data are given for materials in their standard state (at 25 °C [77 °F], 100 kPa). verify (what is ?) Infobox references

2-Methyltetrahydrofuran (2-MeTHF) is an organic compound with the molecular formula C_{5}H_{10}O. It is a highly flammable, mobile liquid. It is mainly used as a replacement for tetrahydrofuran (THF) in specialized applications for its better performance, such as to obtain higher reaction temperatures, or easier separations (as, unlike THF, it is not miscible with water). It is derived from sugars via furfural and is occasionally touted as a biofuel.

== Structures and properties ==
2-Methyltetrahydrofuran is "inversely soluble" in water. That is, its solubility decreases with increasing temperature, which is a rare property. The solubility of water in 2-methyltetrahydrofuran is reported to be 14.4 g/ 100 g at 23 °C. Much like tetrahydrofuran, 2-methyltetrahydrofuran can act as a Lewis base in organometallic reactions. 2-Methyltetrahydrofuran is usually produced as a racemic mixture.

== Preparation ==
2-Methyltetrahydrofuran is usually synthesized by catalytic hydrogenation of furfural.

OC_{4}H_{3}CHO + 4 H_{2} → OC_{4}H_{7}CH_{3} + H_{2}O

Furfural is produced by the acid-catalyzed digestion of pentosan sugars, C_{5} polysaccharides, in biomass. Thus, the raw materials of 2-methyltetrahydrofuran are renewable biomass rich with cellulose, hemicelluloses, and lignin, such as corncobs or bagasse and other plant and agricultural waste.

2-Methyltetrahydrofuran can also be produced starting from levulinic acid. Cyclization and reduction gives γ-valerolactone:

γ-Valerolactone can be hydrogenated to 1,4-pentanediol, which can then be dehydrated to give 2-methyltetrahydrofuran:

== Applications ==
2-Methyltetrahydrofuran is mainly used as a higher boiling substitute for tetrahydrofuran as a specialty solvent. It also is used in the electrolyte formulation for secondary lithium electrodes and as a component in alternative fuels. It is a valued solvent for low-temperature reactions. 2-Methyltetrahydrofuran forms a glass, which does not crystallize, and is frequently used as a solvent for spectroscopic studies at −196 °C.

Other common uses of 2-methyltetrahydrofuran is as a solvent for Grignard reagents used in organometallic and biphasic chemical processes, because of the oxygen atom's ability to coordinate to the magnesium ion component of the Grignard reagent, or to azeotropically dry products. The use of 2-methyltetrahydrofuran provides very clean organic water phase separations. It is a popular, but costlier substitute for tetrahydrofuran.

2-Methyltetrahydrofuran is approved by the United States Department of Energy as an additive to gasoline. Furfural and other furyl compounds (furfuryl alcohol, methylfuran, tetrahydrofufuryl alcohol) have a tendency to polymerize and are quite volatile. 2-Methyltetrahydrofuran itself, however, is more stable and less volatile, and thus is suitable for use as a motor fuel.

2-Methyltetrahydrofuran has been promoted as an ecologically-friendly alternative to THF. Whereas 2-MeTHF is more expensive, it may provide for greater overall process economy. 2-MeTHF has solvating properties that are intermediate between diethyl ether and THF, has limited water miscibility, and forms an azeotrope with water on distillation. Its lower melting point makes it useful for lower temperature reactions, and its higher boiling point allows procedures under reflux at higher temperatures (relative to THF).
