= Metalation =

Chemical reaction that forms a bond to a metal

Metalation (Alt. spelling: Metallation) is a chemical reaction that forms a bond to a metal. This reaction usually refers to the replacement of a halogen atom in an organic molecule with a metal atom, resulting in an organometallic compound. In the laboratory, metalation is commonly used to activate organic molecules during the formation of C–X bonds (where X is typically carbon, oxygen, or nitrogen), which are necessary for the synthesis of many organic molecules.

In synthesis, metallated reagents are typically involved in nucleophilic substitution, single-electron-transfer (SET), and redox chemistry with functional groups on other molecules (including but not limited to ketones, aldehydes and alkyl halides). Metallated molecules may also participate in acid–base chemistry, with one organometallic reagent deprotonating an organic molecule to create a new organometallic reagent.

The most common classes of metallated compounds are organolithium reagents and Grignard reagents. However, other organometallic compounds – such as organozinc compounds – also experience common use in both laboratory and industrial applications.

== History ==
Metalation was first observed in the laboratory by Edward Frankland during a synthesis of diethylzinc in 1849. While this development eventually led to the development of organometallic compounds of other metals, these compounds saw little use in the laboratory because of their expense and (in the case of organozinc compounds) their highly pyrophoric nature. Metalation reactions (particularly in the form of transmetalation) only began to see more widespread use in synthetic laboratories after François Auguste Victor Grignard’s synthesized organomagnesium halides directly from metallic magnesium and organic halides. These newfound organomagnesium reagents' extreme versatility in organic synthesis caused metalation to see widespread use in laboratory science. Organolithium reagents were synthesized for the first time in 1917 by Schlenk and Holtz, though these reagents did not see widespread use as metallating agents or reagents in organic synthesis until Karl Ziegler, Henry Gilman, and Georg Wittig — among others — developed synthetic methods that improved upon this initial synthesis. After these improvements in synthesis came to be known, interest in the compounds increased significantly, as they are generally more reactive than organomagnesium compounds. The first use of an organolithium reagent as a metalation reagent occurred in 1928, with Schlenk and Bergmann's metalation of fluorene with ethyllithium.

== Mechanism and applications ==
=== Transmetalation ===
Transmetalation involves the exchange of two metals between organic molecules by a redox exchange mechanism. For example, transmetalations often form a reaction between an organolithium reagent and a metal salt.

=== Organolithium reagent ===
When synthesizing simple organolithium reagents, the reduction of one equivalent of a simple alkyl or aryl halide with two equivalents of lithium metal produces one equivalent of a simple alkyl- or aryl-lithium and one equivalent of lithium halide with good yield.

$\ce{{R-X} + 2Li -> {R-Li} + Li-X}$

This reaction is known to proceed via a radical pathway that is likely initiated through a single-electron-transfer mechanism of the type shown below.

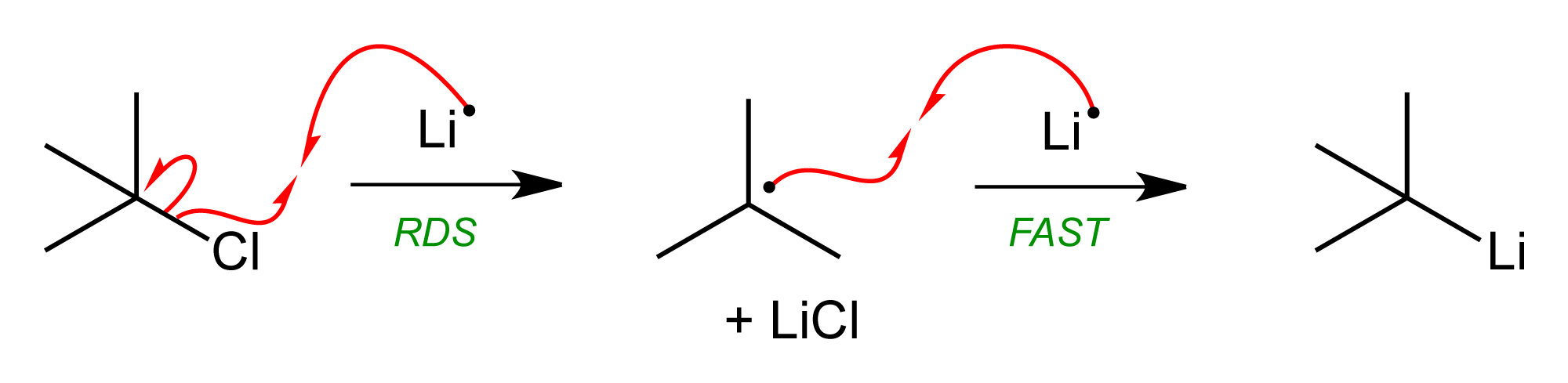

Magnesium similarly metalates organohalides to give Grignard reagents.
