= N-Propyl iodide =

n-Propyl iodide; 1-Propyl iodide
- Structural formula of n-propyl iodide

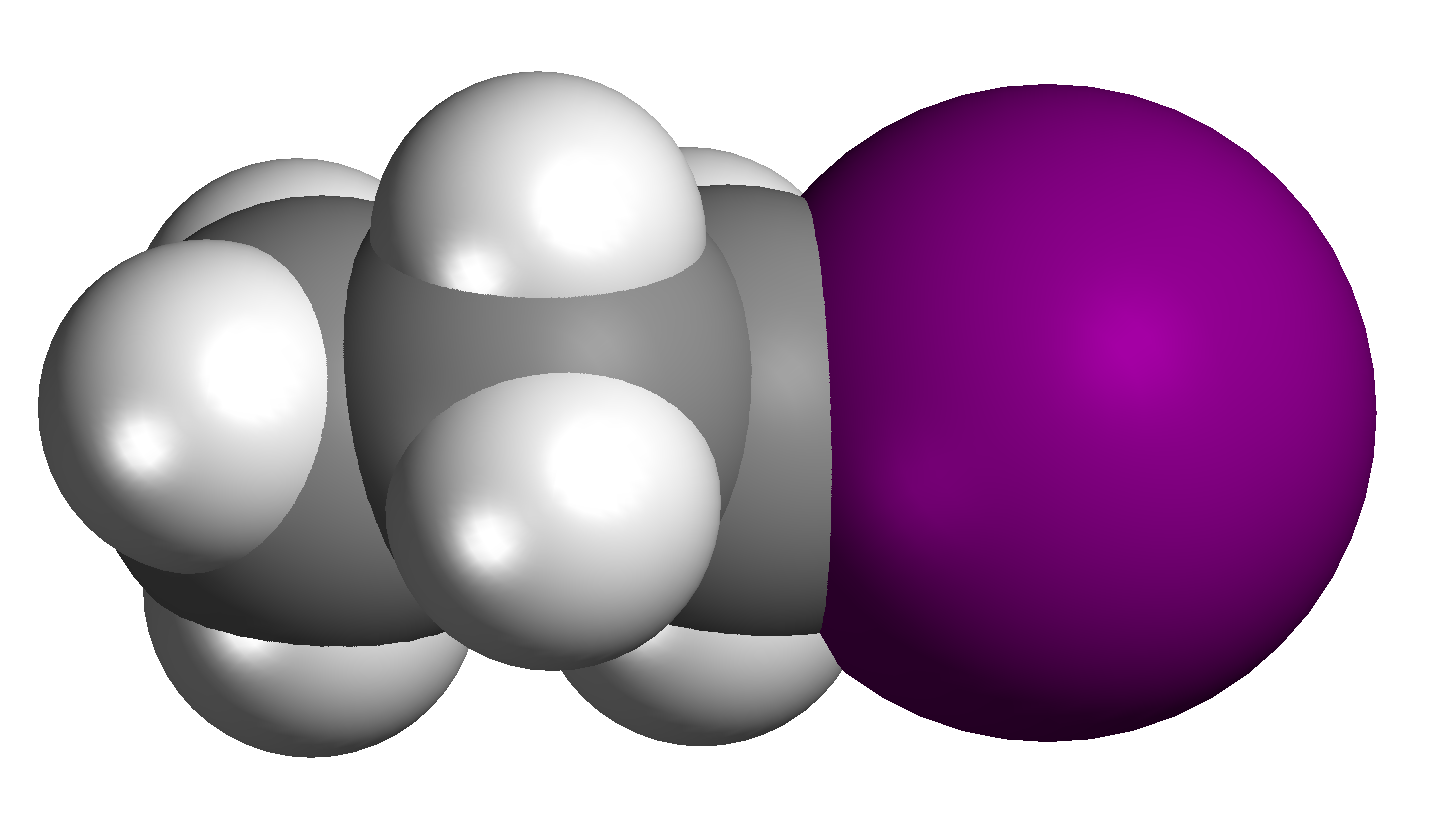
- Space-filling model of n-propyl iodide

Names
- Preferred IUPAC name 1-Iodopropane

Identifiers
CAS Number	107-08-4
3D model (JSmol)	Interactive image
Abbreviations	1-IP; IP; PrI n-PrI nPrI^{n}PrI
Beilstein Reference	505937
ChemSpider	31029
ECHA InfoCard	100.003.147
EC Number	203-460-2
PubChem CID	33643
UNII	ND3629KE2K
UN number	2392
CompTox Dashboard (EPA)	DTXSID501015653 DTXSID5075317, DTXSID501015653
- InChI: InChI=1S/C3H7I/c1-2-3-4/h2-3H2,1H3 Key: PVWOIHVRPOBWPI-UHFFFAOYSA-N
- SMILES: CCCI

Properties
Chemical formula	C_{3}H_{7}I
Molar mass	169.993 g·mol^{−1}
Appearance	Colorless liquid
Density	1.743
Melting point	−101.40 °C; −150.52 °F; 171.75 K
Boiling point	101.6 to 103.2 °C; 214.8 to 217.7 °F; 374.7 to 376.3 K
Solubility in water	1.1 g/L (at 20 °C)
Solubility in ethanol	Miscible
Solubility in diethyl ether	Miscible
Vapor pressure	5.733 kPa
Henry's law constant (k_{H})	1.2 μmol Pa^{−1} kg^{−1}
Refractive index (n_{D})	1.5051
Viscosity	7.438 mPa (at 20 °C)

Thermochemistry
Heat capacity (C)	136.2 J K^{−1} mol^{−1}
Std enthalpy of formation (Δ_{f}H^{⦵}_{298})	−687–−627 kJ mol^{−1}

Hazards
- GHS labelling
Pictograms	(GHS02: Flammable) (GHS07: Exclamation mark)
Signal word	Warning
Hazard statements	H226, H302, H315, H319, H332, H335
Precautionary statements	P261, P305+P351+P338
Flash point	44 °C (111 °F; 317 K)
- Lethal dose or concentration (LD, LC)
LD_{50} (median dose)	297 mg/kg (IP, mouse); 300 mg/kg (IV, mouse); 595 mg/kg (IP, guinea pig); 650 mg/kg (IP, rat); >1.8 g/kg (oral, mouse)
Safety data sheet (SDS)	fishersci.com

Related compounds
Related iodoalkanes	Ethyl iodide; Isopropyl iodide; Butyl iodide
Related compounds	Propane; n-Propyl chloride; n-Propyl bromide
- Except where otherwise noted, data are given for materials in their standard state (at 25 °C [77 °F], 100 kPa). verify (what is ?) Infobox references

n-Propyl iodide (also 1-propyl iodide or 1-iodopropane) is a colorless, flammable chemical compound. It has the chemical formula C_{3}H_{7}I or CH_{3}CH_{2}CH_{2}I and is prepared by heating n-propyl alcohol with iodine and phosphorus.
