= 2-Bromopropane =

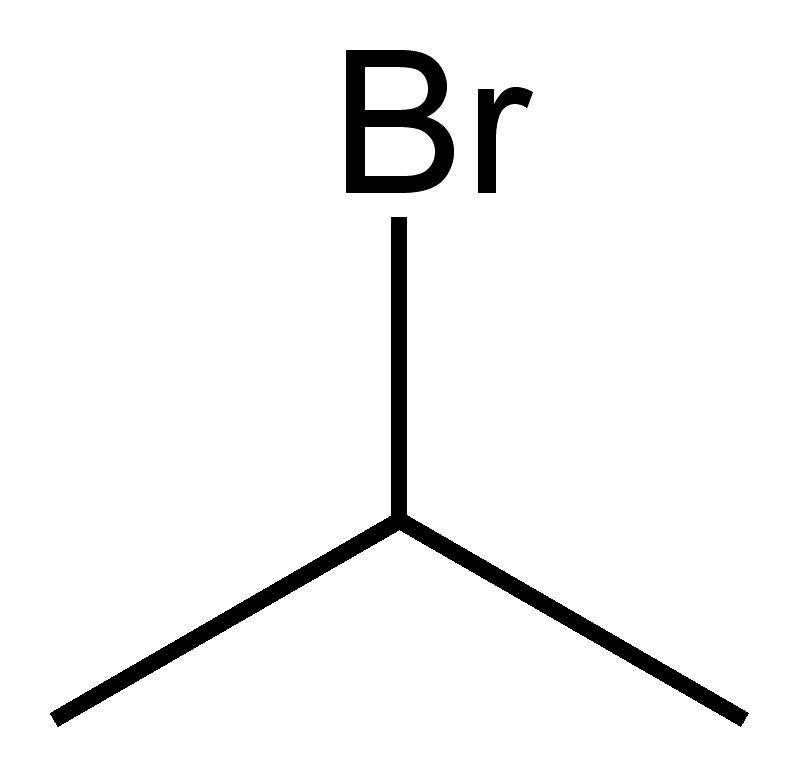
Skeletal formula of 2-bromopropane
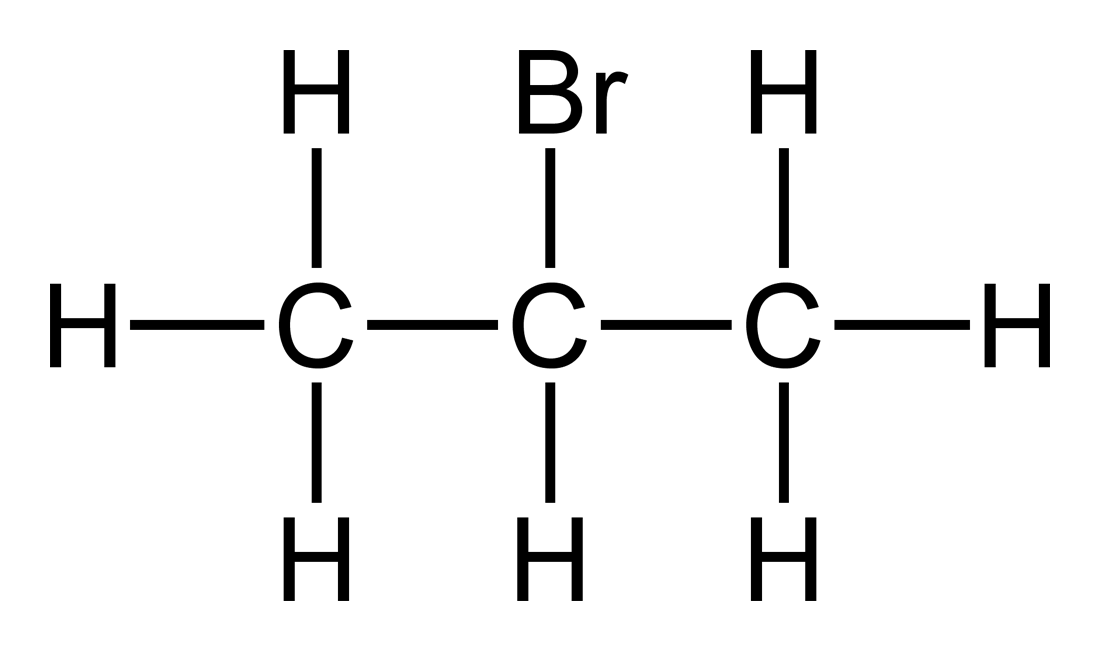
Skeletal formula of 2-bromopropane with all explicit hydrogens added
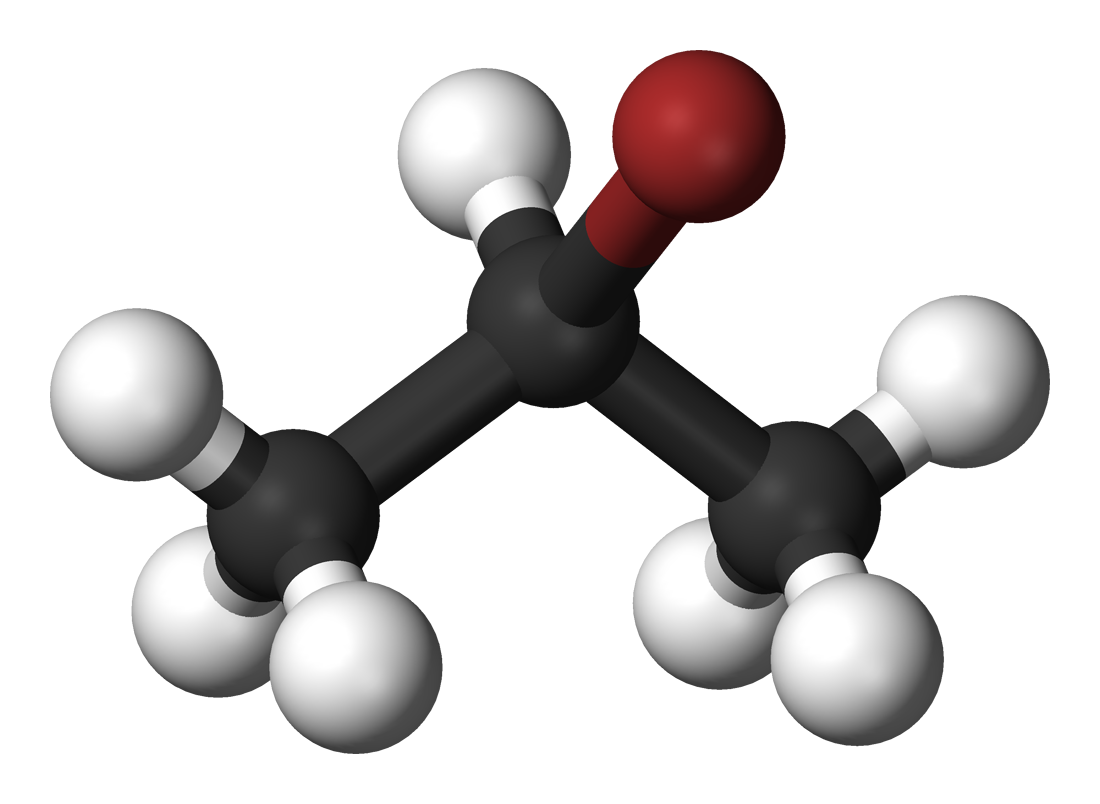
Ball and stick model of 2-bromopropane
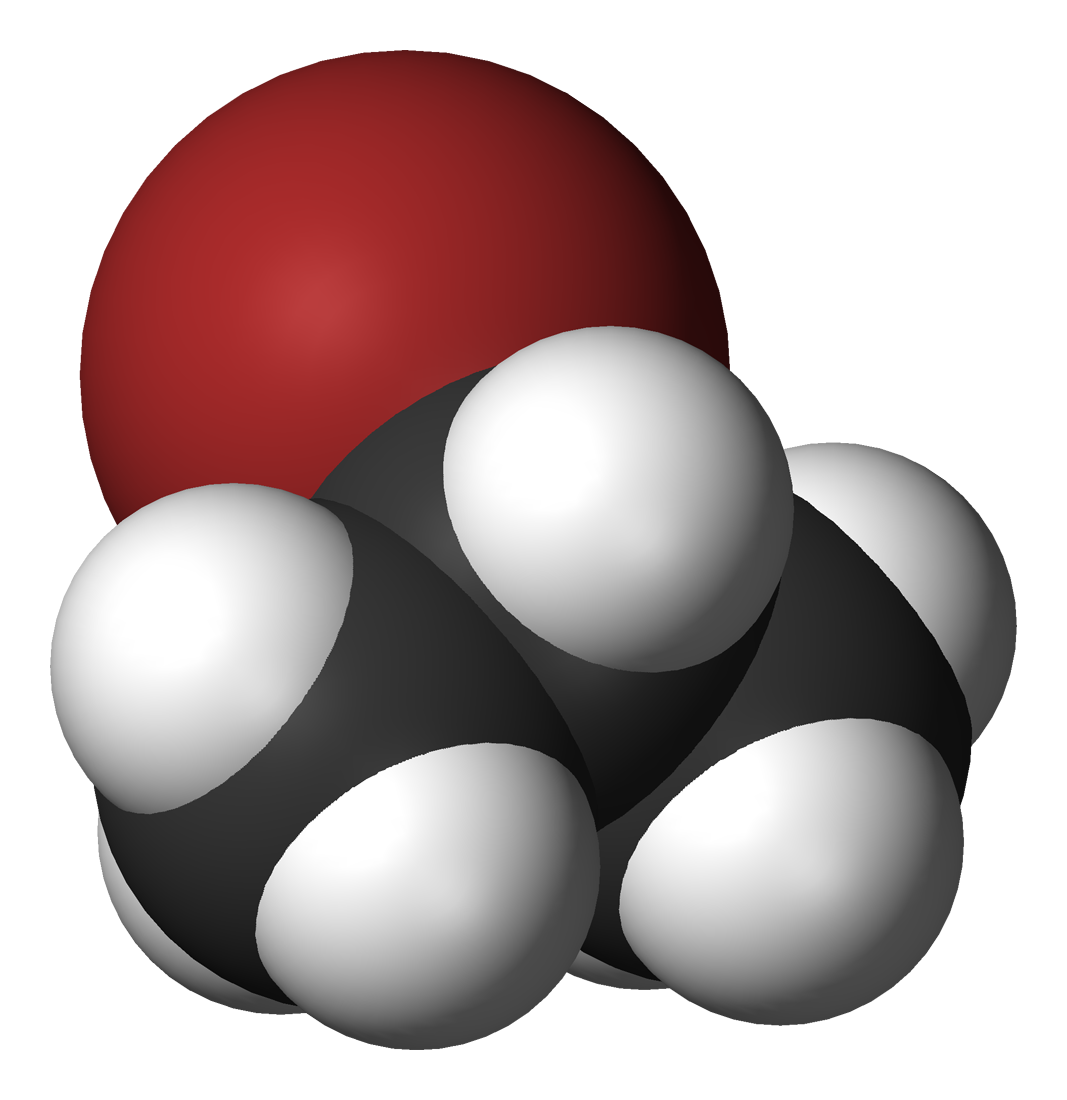
Spacefill model of 2-bromopropane

Names
- Preferred IUPAC name 2-Bromopropane
- Other names Isopropyl bromide

Identifiers
CAS Number	75-26-3
3D model (JSmol)	Interactive image
Abbreviations	i-PrBr iPrBr^{i}PrBr
Beilstein Reference	741852
ChEMBL	ChEMBL451810
ChemSpider	6118
ECHA InfoCard	100.000.778
EC Number	200-855-1
MeSH	2-bromopropane
PubChem CID	6358
RTECS number	TX4111000
UNII	R651XOV97Z
UN number	2344
CompTox Dashboard (EPA)	DTXSID7030197
- InChI: InChI=1S/C3H7Br/c1-3(2)4/h3H,1-2H3 Key: NAMYKGVDVNBCFQ-UHFFFAOYSA-N
- SMILES: CC(C)Br

Properties
Chemical formula	C_{3}H_{7}Br
Molar mass	122.993 g·mol^{−1}
Appearance	Colorless liquid
Density	1.31 g mL^{−1}
Melting point	−89.0 °C; −128.1 °F; 184.2 K
Boiling point	59 to 61 °C; 138 to 142 °F; 332 to 334 K
Solubility in water	3.2 g L^{−1} (at 20 °C)
log P	2.136
Vapor pressure	32 kPa (at 20 °C)
Henry's law constant (k_{H})	1.0 μmol Pa^{−1} mol^{−1}
Refractive index (n_{D})	1.4251
Viscosity	0.4894 mPa s (at 20 °C)

Thermochemistry
Heat capacity (C)	135.6 J K mol^{−1}
Std enthalpy of formation (Δ_{f}H^{⦵}_{298})	−129 kJ mol^{−1}
Std enthalpy of combustion (Δ_{c}H^{⦵}_{298})	−2.0537–−2.0501 MJ mol^{−1}

Hazards
- GHS labelling
Pictograms	(GHS02: Flammable) (GHS08: Health hazard)
Signal word	Danger
Hazard statements	H225, H360, H373
Precautionary statements	P210, P308+P313
NFPA 704 (fire diamond)	2 3 0
Flash point	19 °C (66 °F; 292 K)

Related compounds
Related alkanes	Bromoethane; 1-Bromopropane; tert-Butyl bromide; 1-Bromobutane; 2-Bromobutane
- Except where otherwise noted, data are given for materials in their standard state (at 25 °C [77 °F], 100 kPa). verify (what is ?) Infobox references

2-Bromopropane, also known as isopropyl bromide and 2-propyl bromide, is the halogenated hydrocarbon with the formula C_{3}H_{7}Br or CH_{3}CHBrCH_{3}. It is a colorless liquid. It is used for introducing the isopropyl functional group in organic synthesis. 2-Bromopropane is prepared by heating isopropanol with hydrobromic acid.

== Preparation ==
2-Bromopropane is commercially available. It may be prepared in the ordinary manner of alkyl bromides, by reacting isopropanol with phosphorus and bromine, or with phosphorus tribromide.

The organomercury compound diisopropylmercury may be prepared through the magnesium-catalysed reaction of 2-bromopropane with mercuric chloride.

== Safety ==
Short-chain alkyl halides are often carcinogenic.

The bromine atom is at the secondary position, which allows the molecule to undergo dehydrohalogenation easily to give propene, which escapes as a gas and can rupture closed reaction vessels. When this reagent is used in base catalyzed reactions, potassium carbonate should be used in place of sodium or potassium hydroxide.
