= N-Propyl chloride =

n-Propyl chloride

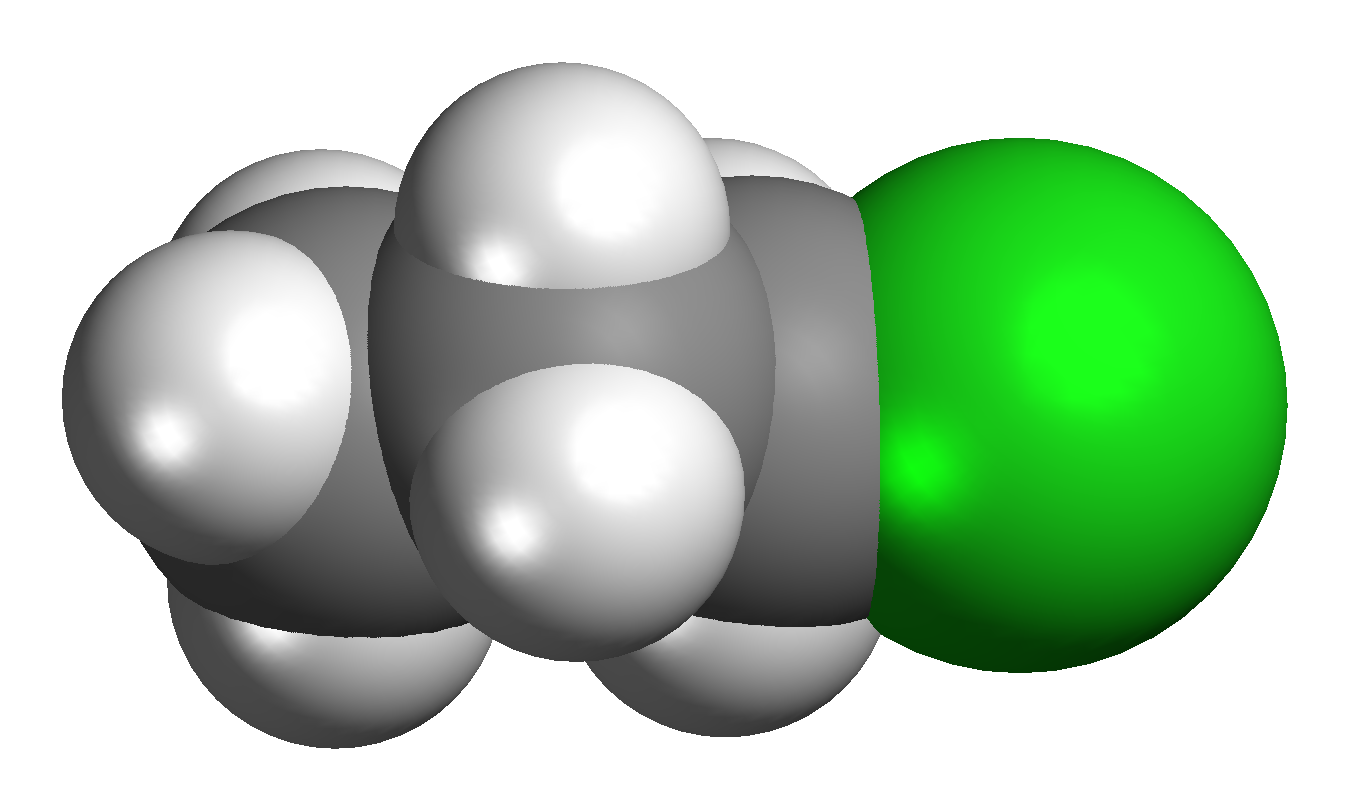

Names
- Preferred IUPAC name 1-Chloropropane
- Other names chloromethylethane, propyl chloride, 1-propyl chloride

Identifiers
CAS Number	540-54-5
3D model (JSmol)	Interactive image
Abbreviations	PrCl n-PrCl nPrCl^{n}PrCl
ChEMBL	ChEMBL15697
ChemSpider	10437
ECHA InfoCard	100.007.955
EC Number	208-749-7
PubChem CID	10899
UNII	TUV7462NWK
UN number	1278
CompTox Dashboard (EPA)	DTXSID3051462
- InChI: InChI=1S/C3H7Cl/c1-2-3-4/h2-3H2,1H3 Key: SNMVRZFUUCLYTO-UHFFFAOYSA-N
- SMILES: ClCCC

Properties
Chemical formula	C_{3}H_{7}Cl
Molar mass	78.54 g·mol^{−1}
Appearance	Colorless liquid
Density	0.890
Melting point	−122.8 °C (−189.0 °F; 150.3 K)
Boiling point	46.7 °C (116.1 °F; 319.8 K)
Solubility in water	0.27 g/100 ml at 20 °C
Solubility in ethanol	miscible
Solubility in diethyl ether	miscible
Refractive index (n_{D})	1.3886
Viscosity	4.416 cP at 0 °C; 3.589 cP at 20 °C

Hazards
- Occupational safety and health (OHS/OSH)
Main hazards	Highly flammable liquid and vapor. Vapors may cause flash fire. Harmful if swallowed or inhaled. May be harmful if absorbed through skin. Affects central nervous system. Causes irritation to skin, eyes and respiratory tract.
- GHS labelling
Pictograms	(GHS02: Flammable) (GHS07: Exclamation mark)
Signal word	Danger
Hazard statements	H225, H302, H312, H332
Precautionary statements	P210, P233, P240, P241, P242, P243, P261, P264, P270, P271, P280, P301+P312, P302+P352, P303+P361+P353, P304+P312, P304+P340, P312, P322, P330, P363, P370+P378, P403+P235, P501
NFPA 704 (fire diamond)	2 3 0
Flash point	−18 °C (0 °F; 255 K)
Safety data sheet (SDS)	External MSDS

Related compounds
Related alkyl halides	Ethyl chloride isopropyl chloride Tert-Butyl chloride
- Except where otherwise noted, data are given for materials in their standard state (at 25 °C [77 °F], 100 kPa). verify (what is ?) Infobox references

n-Propyl chloride (also 1-propyl chloride or 1-chloropropane) is a colorless, flammable chemical compound. It has the chemical formula C_{3}H_{7}Cl or CH_{3}CH_{2}CH_{2}Cl and is prepared by reacting n-propyl alcohol with phosphorus trichloride in the presence of a zinc chloride catalyst.

== Properties ==
1-Chloropropane is the simplest asymmetric chloropropane, analogous to the symmetric 2-chloropropane. Because of the presence of the heavy electronegative chlorine atom, 1-chloropropane has a higher melting point and boiling point than propane (BP 46.6 °C vs −42 °C).

== Toxicity ==
=== Acute effects ===
1-Chloropropane has been associated with acute toxic effects in various studies. In a rat study, the LD50 (lethal dose for 50% of the test subjects) for oral ingestion was found to be greater than 2 grams per kilogram of body weight. This suggests a relatively low acute toxicity when ingested by rats.

=== Non-human toxicity ===
In laboratory animal studies, exposure to 1-chloropropane has been associated with adverse effects. Rats exposed to high concentrations of 1-chloropropane exhibited alveolar hemorrhage and liver necrosis. Additionally, the compound has been rated for its eye irritant potential in rabbit studies.

=== Environmental fate and exposure ===
1-Chloropropane can enter the environment through various waste streams, and it has been detected in volcanic emissions. In the atmosphere, it can undergo degradation through reaction with hydroxyl radicals, with an estimated half-life of about 15 days.

The compound is expected to have high mobility in soil, and volatilization from both moist and dry soil surfaces is anticipated. 1-Chloropropane may resist aerobic biodegradation in soil and water, but anaerobic dehalogenation can occur.

In aquatic environments, 1-chloropropane is not expected to adsorb to suspended solids and sediment. It can rapidly volatilize from water surfaces, and its potential for bioconcentration in aquatic organisms is considered low.

=== Human exposure ===
Occupational exposure to 1-chloropropane may occur through inhalation and dermal contact in workplaces where the compound is produced or used. Additionally, the general population can be exposed to 1-chloropropane through inhalation of ambient air and dermal contact with vapors and products containing the compound.
