= List of UN numbers 2301 to 2400 =

UN numbers from UN2301 to UN2400 as assigned by the United Nations Committee of Experts on the Transport of Dangerous Goods are as follows:

== UN 2301 to UN 2400 ==
UN Number	Class	Proper Shipping Name
UN 2301	3	2-Methylfuran
UN 2302	3	5-Methylhexan-2-one
UN 2303	3	Isopropenylbenzene
UN 2304	4.1	Naphthalene, molten
UN 2305	8	Nitrobenzenesulfonic acid
UN 2306	6.1	Nitrobenzotrifluorides, liquid
UN 2307	6.1	3-Nitro-4-chlorobenzotrifluoride
UN 2308	8	Nitrosylsulfuric acid
UN 2309	3	Octadiene
UN 2310	3	Pentane-2,4-dione
UN 2311	6.1	Phenetidines
UN 2312	6.1	Phenol, molten
UN 2313	3	Picolines
UN 2314	?	(UN No. no longer in use)
UN 2315	9	Polychlorinated biphenyls, liquid
UN 2316	6.1	Sodium cuprocyanide, solid
UN 2317	6.1	Sodium cuprocyanide, solution
UN 2318	4.2	Sodium hydrosulfide, with less than 25 percent water of crystallization
UN 2319	3	Terpene hydrocarbons, n.o.s.
UN 2320	8	Tetraethylenepentamine
UN 2321	6.1	Trichlorobenzenes, liquid
UN 2322	6.1	Trichlorobutene
UN 2323	3	Triethyl phosphite
UN 2324	3	Triisobutylene
UN 2325	3	1,3,5-Trimethylbenzene (Mesitylene)
UN 2326	8	Trimethylcyclohexylamine
UN 2327	8	Trimethylhexamethylenediamine
UN 2328	6.1	Trimethylhexamethylene diisocyanate
UN 2329	3	Trimethyl phosphite
UN 2330	3	Undecane
UN 2331	8	Zinc chloride, anhydrous
UN 2332	3	Acetaldehyde oxime
UN 2333	3	Allyl acetate
UN 2334	6.1	Allylamine
UN 2335	3	Allyl ethyl ether
UN 2336	3	Allyl formate
UN 2337	6.1	Phenyl mercaptan
UN 2338	3	Benzotrifluoride
UN 2339	3	2-Bromobutane
UN 2340	3	2-Bromoethyl ethyl ether
UN 2341	3	1-Bromo-3-methylbutane
UN 2342	3	Bromomethylpropanes
UN 2343	3	2-Bromopentane
UN 2344	3	Bromopropanes
UN 2345	3	3-Bromopropyne
UN 2346	3	Butanedione
UN 2347	3	Butyl mercaptans
UN 2348	3	Butyl acrylates, inhibited
UN 2349	?	(UN No. no longer in use)
UN 2350	3	Butyl methyl ether
UN 2351	3	Butyl nitrites
UN 2352	3	Butyl vinyl ether, inhibited
UN 2353	3	Butyryl chloride
UN 2354	3	Chloromethyl ethyl ether
UN 2355	?	(UN No. no longer in use)
UN 2356	3	2-Chloropropane
UN 2357	8	Cyclohexylamine
UN 2358	3	Cyclooctatetraene
UN 2359	3	Diallylamine
UN 2360	3	Diallylether
UN 2361	3	Diisobutylamine
UN 2362	3	1,1-Dichloroethane
UN 2363	3	Ethyl mercaptan
UN 2364	3	n-Propylbenzene
UN 2365	?	(UN No. no longer in use)
UN 2366	3	Diethyl carbonate
UN 2367	3	alpha-Methylvaleraldehyde
UN 2368	3	alpha-Pinene
UN 2369	?	(UN No. no longer in use) Ethylene glycol monobutyl ether (UN No. no longer in use)
UN 2370	3	1-Hexene
UN 2371	3	Isopentenes
UN 2372	3	1,2-Di-(dimethylamino)ethane
UN 2373	3	Diethoxymethane
UN 2374	3	3,3-Diethoxypropene
UN 2375	3	Diethyl sulfide
UN 2376	3	2,3-Dihydropyran
UN 2377	3	1,1-Dimethoxyethane
UN 2378	3	2-Dimethylaminoacetonitrile
UN 2379	3	1,3-Dimethylbutylamine
UN 2380	3	Dimethyldiethoxysilane
UN 2381	3	Dimethyl disulfide
UN 2382	6.1	Dimethylhydrazine, symmetrical
UN 2383	3	Dipropylamine
UN 2384	3	Di-n-propyl ether
UN 2385	3	Ethyl isobutyrate
UN 2386	3	1-Ethylpiperidine
UN 2387	3	Fluorobenzene
UN 2388	3	Fluorotoluenes
UN 2389	3	Furan
UN 2390	3	2-Iodobutane
UN 2391	3	Iodomethylpropanes
UN 2392	3	Iodopropanes
UN 2393	3	Isobutyl formate
UN 2394	3	Isobutyl propionate
UN 2395	3	Isobutyryl chloride
UN 2396	3	Methacrylaldehyde, inhibited
UN 2397	3	3-Methylbutan-2-one
UN 2398	3	Methyl tert-butyl ether
UN 2399	3	1-Methylpiperidine
UN 2400	3	Methyl isovalerate

== See also ==
- Lists of UN numbers
