= Bromopentane =

Group of chemical compounds

Bromopentanes are a group of bromoalkanes consisting of pentane isomers with one or more hydrogen atoms replaced by bromine atoms. They have the formula C_{5}H_{12–n}Br_{n}, where n = 1–12 is the number of bromine atoms. They are colorless liquids.

== Monobromopentane ==
Monobromopentanes are bromopentanes containing one bromine atom, with the formula C_{5}H_{11}Br.

There are three isomers of unbranched monobromopentane:

- 1-Bromopentane
- 2-Bromopentane (chiral)
- 3-Bromopentane

There are four isomers of monobromopentane based on 2-methylbutane:

- 1-Bromo-2-methylbutane (chiral)
- 1-Bromo-3-methylbutane
- 2-Bromo-2-methylbutane
- 2-Bromo-3-methylbutane (chiral)

2,2-Dimethylpropane has only one monobrominated derivative, 1-bromo-2,2-dimethylpropane, also known as neopentyl bromide.

== See also ==
- Bromoalkane
- Bromomethane
- Bromoethane
- Bromopropane
- Bromobutane
- Bromohexane
