= C2H5NO =

The molecular formula C_{2}H_{5}NO (molar mass: 59.07 g/mol, exact mass: 59.03711 u) may refer to:

- Acetaldoxime
- Acetamide
- Aminoacetaldehyde
- N-Methylformamide (NMF)
