= C19H33NO2 =

The molecular formula C_{19}H_{33}NO_{2} (molar mass: 307.48 g/mol, exact mass: 307.2511 u) may refer to:

- Dysidazirine
- Fingolimod
