= Bromomethane =

Organobromine pesticide

- Stereo, skeletal formula of bromomethane with all explicit hydrogens added

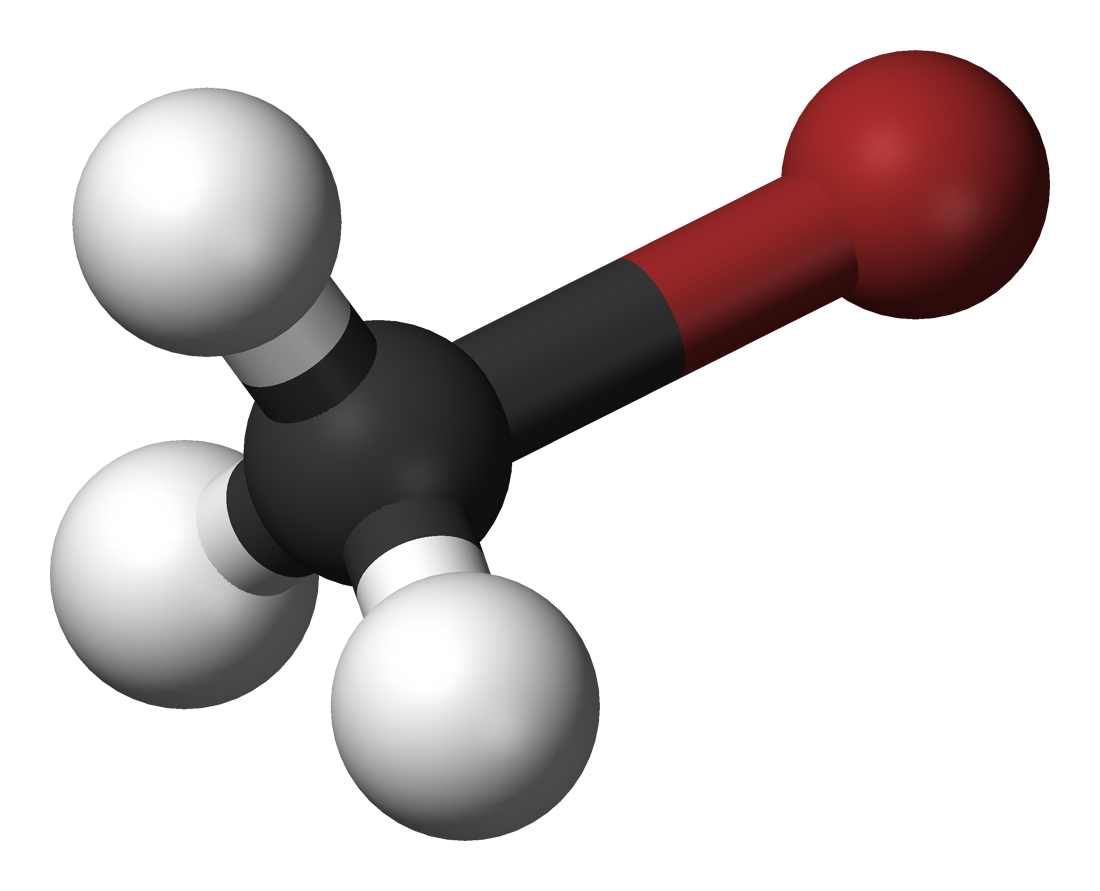
Ball and stick model of bromomethane
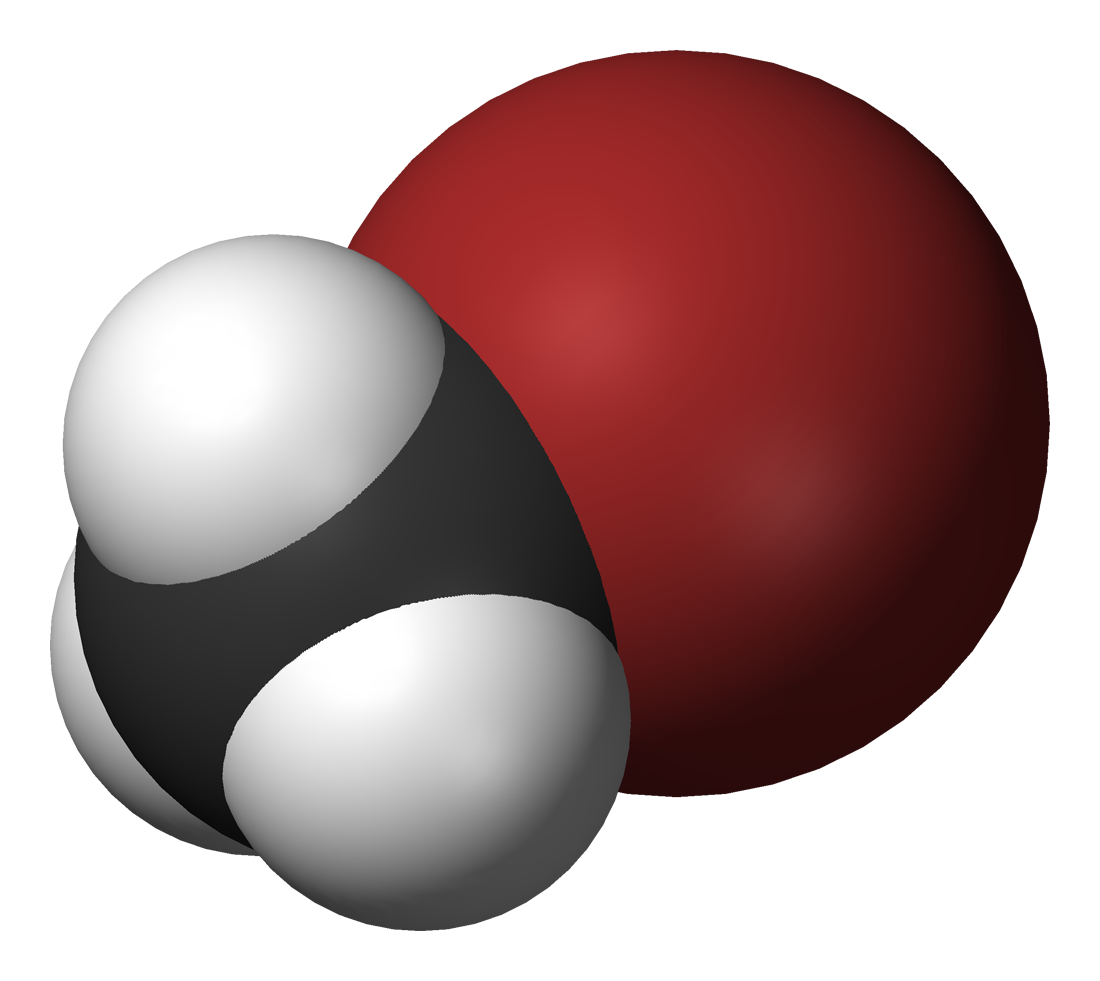
Spacefill model of bromomethane

Names
- Preferred IUPAC name Bromomethane

Identifiers
CAS Number	74-83-9
3D model (JSmol)	Interactive image
Abbreviations	MeBr
Beilstein Reference	1209223
ChEBI	CHEBI:39275
ChEMBL	ChEMBL48339
ChemSpider	6083
ECHA InfoCard	100.000.740
EC Number	200-813-2
Gmelin Reference	916
KEGG	C18447
MeSH	methyl+bromide
PubChem CID	6323
RTECS number	PA4900000
UNII	9V42E1Z7B6
UN number	1062
CompTox Dashboard (EPA)	DTXSID8020832
- InChI: InChI=1S/CH3Br/c1-2/h1H3 Key: GZUXJHMPEANEGY-UHFFFAOYSA-N
- SMILES: CBr

Properties
Chemical formula	CH_{3}Br
Molar mass	94.939 g·mol^{−1}
Appearance	Colorless gas
Odor	Chloroform-like
Density	3.97 kg/m^{3} (gas, 0 °C); 1.72 g/mL (liquid, 4 °C)
Melting point	−93.66 °C (−136.59 °F; 179.49 K)
Boiling point	4.0 °C (39.2 °F; 277.1 K)
Solubility in water	17.5 gL^{−1}
log P	1.3
Vapor pressure	190 kPa (at 20 °C, 68 °F)
Magnetic susceptibility (χ)	−42.8·10^{−6} cm^{3}·mol^{−1}

Thermochemistry
Std enthalpy of formation (Δ_{f}H^{⦵}_{298})	−35.1 – −33.5 kJ·mol^{−1}

Hazards
- GHS labelling
Pictograms	(GHS06: Toxic) (GHS07: Exclamation mark) (GHS08: Health hazard) (GHS09: Environmental hazard)
Signal word	Danger
Hazard statements	H301, H315, H319, H331, H335, H341, H373, H400, H420
Precautionary statements	P201, P202, P260, P264, P270, P271, P273, P280, P281, P301+P310, P302+P352, P304+P340, P305+P351+P338, P308+P313, P311, P312, P314, P321, P330, P332+P313, P337+P313, P362, P391, P403+P233, P405, P501, P502
NFPA 704 (fire diamond)	3 1 0
Flash point	194 °C (381 °F; 467 K)
Autoignition temperature	535 °C (995 °F; 808 K)
Explosive limits	10-16%
- Lethal dose or concentration (LD, LC)
LC_{50} (median concentration)	1200 ppm (mouse, 1 hr); 7316 ppm (rabbit, 30 min); 2833 ppm (rat, 1 hr); 302 ppm (rat, 8 hr); 390 ppm (mouse, 9 hr)
LC_{Lo} (lowest published)	300 ppm (guinea pig, 9 hr)
- NIOSH (US health exposure limits)
PEL (Permissible)	C 20 ppm (80 mg/m^{3}) [skin]
REL (Recommended)	Ca
IDLH (Immediate danger)	Ca [250 ppm]

Related compounds
Related alkanes	Bromoiodomethane; Bromoethane
- Except where otherwise noted, data are given for materials in their standard state (at 25 °C [77 °F], 100 kPa). verify (what is ?) Infobox references

Bromomethane, commonly known as methyl bromide, is an organobromine compound with formula CH_{3}Br. This colorless, odorless, nonflammable gas is produced both industrially and biologically. It is a recognized ozone-depleting chemical. According to the IPCC Fifth Assessment Report, it has a global warming potential of 2. The compound was used extensively as a pesticide until being phased out by most countries in the early 2000s. From a chemistry perspective, it is one of the halomethanes.

== Occurrence and manufacture ==
Marine organisms are estimated to produce 56,000 tonnes annually of methyl bromine. It is also produced in small quantities by certain terrestrial plants, such as members of the family Brassicaceae.

In 2009, an estimated 24,000 tonnes of methyl bromide were produced. Its production was curtailed by the Montreal Protocol, such that in 1983, production was nearly twice that of 2009 levels. It is manufactured by treating methanol with bromine in the presence of sulfur or hydrogen sulfide:

6 CH_{3}OH + 3 Br_{2} + S → 6 CH_{3}Br + 2 H_{2}O + H_{2}SO_{4}

== Uses ==
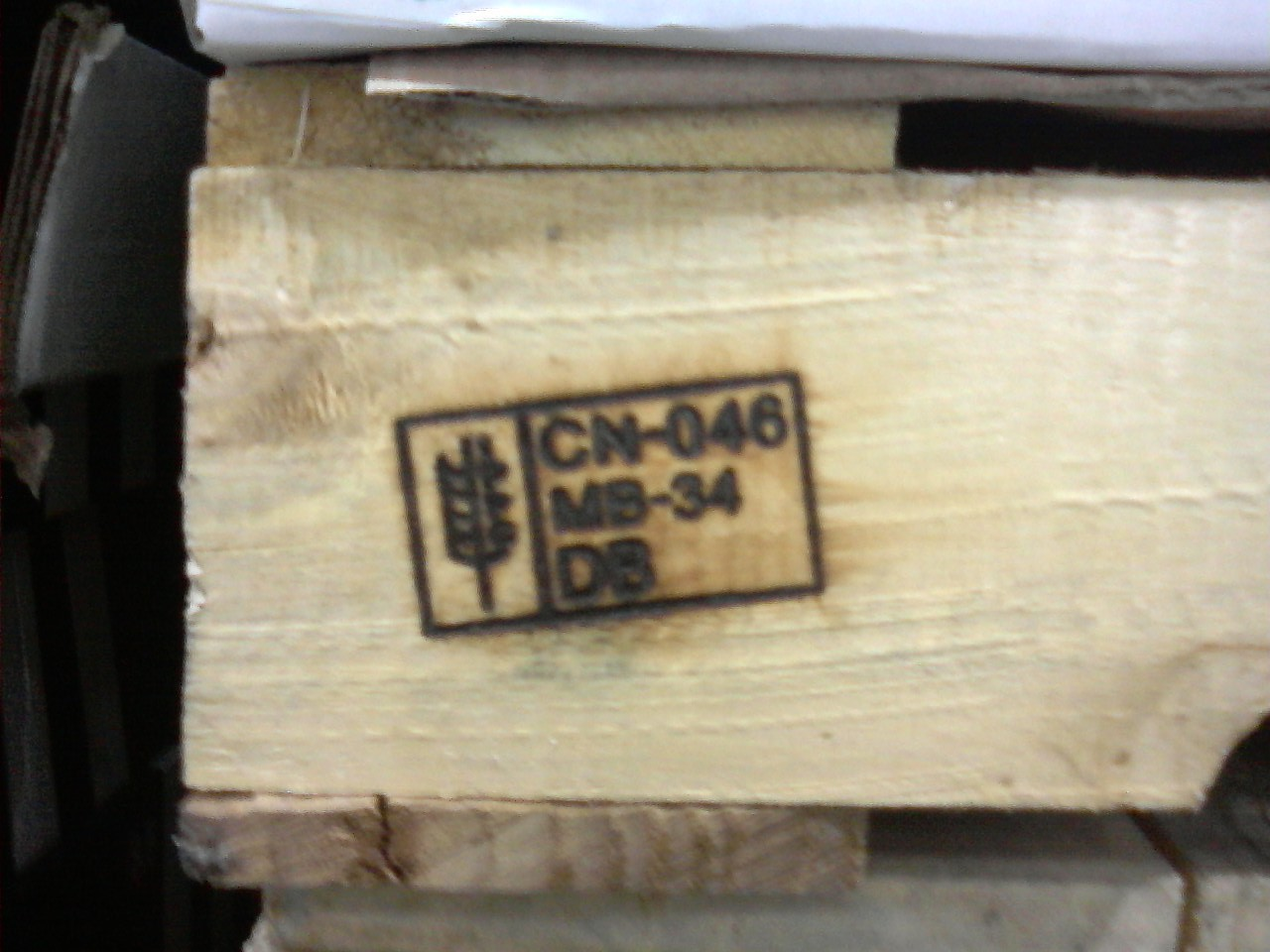
ISPM 15 markings on a pallet from China. The MB indicates the wood has been fumigated with methyl bromide to kill pests.

Most methyl bromide is used for fumigation purposes, while some is used to manufacture other products. It is widely applied as a soil sterilant, mainly for production of seed but also for some crops such as strawberries and almonds. Bromomethane is safer and more effective than some other soil sterilants. Its loss to the seed industry has resulted in changes to cultural practices, with increased reliance on soil steam sterilization, mechanical roguing, and fallow seasons. Bromomethane was also used as a general-purpose fumigant to kill a variety of pests including rats and insects. Bromomethane has poor fungicidal properties. Bromomethane is the only fumigant allowed (heat treatment is the only other option) under ISPM 15 regulations when exporting solid wood packaging (fork lift pallets, crates, bracing) to ISPM 15 compliant countries. Bromomethane is used to prepare golf courses, particularly to control Bermuda grass. The Montreal Protocol stipulates that bromomethane use be phased out.

Bromomethane is also a precursor in the manufacture of pharmaceuticals such as neostigmine bromide, pancuronium bromide, propantheline bromide, pyridostigmine bromide, atropine derivatives, clidinium bromide, clobazam, demecarium bromide, glycopyrrolate, and vecuronium bromide. It is a precursor to many ordinary chemicals often as a methylating agent.

Bromomethane was once used in specialty fire extinguishers, prior to the advent of less toxic halons, as it is electrically non-conductive and leaves no residue. It was used primarily for electrical substations, military aircraft, and other industrial hazards. It was never as popular as other agents due to its high cost and toxicity. Bromomethane was used from the 1920s to the 1960s, and continued to be used in aircraft engine fire suppression systems into the late 1960s.

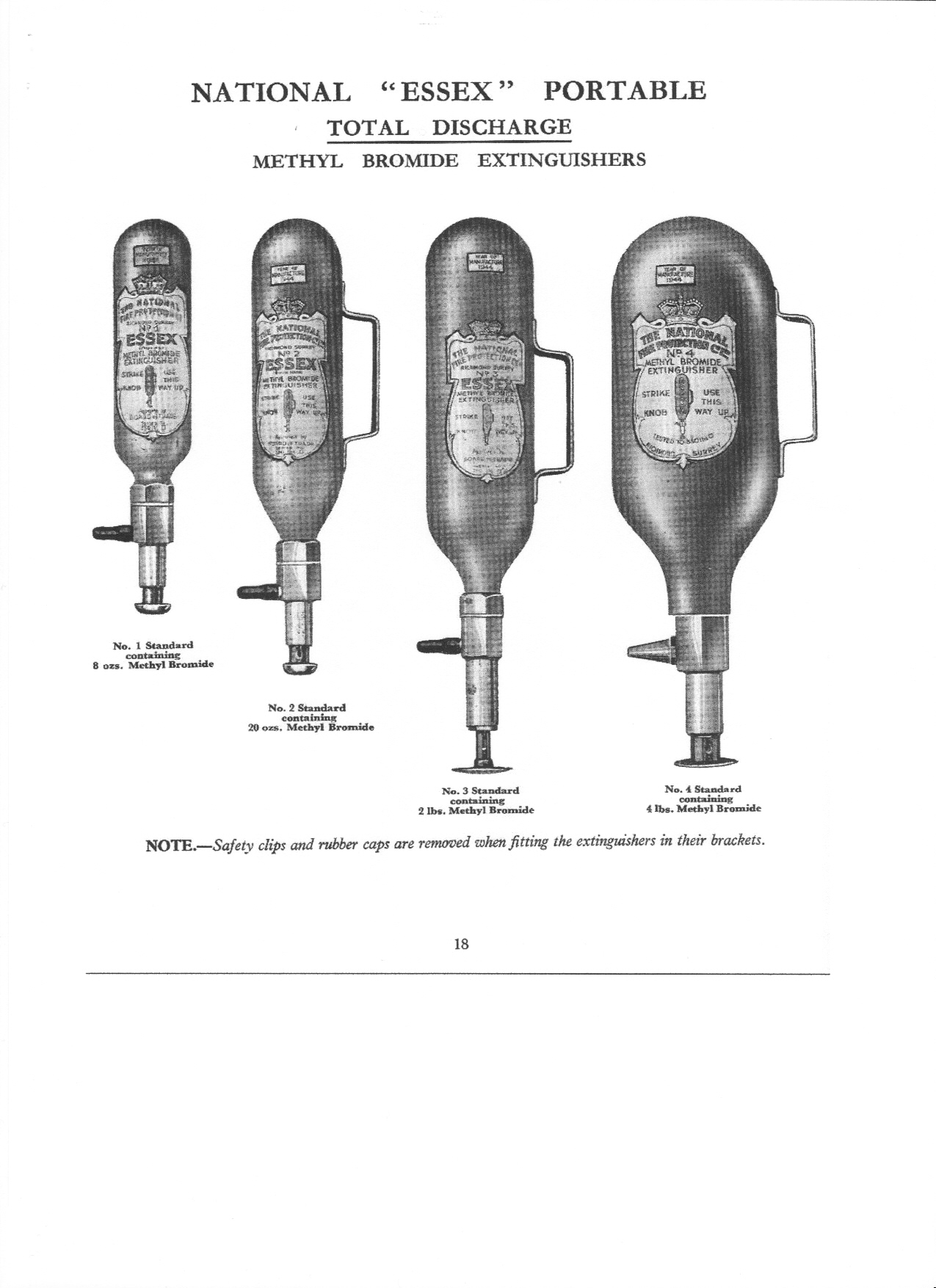
A selection of stored-pressure bromomethane fire extinguishers, circa 1930s-40s, UK

== Regulation ==
Bromomethane is readily photolyzed in the atmosphere to release bromine radicals, which are far more destructive to stratospheric ozone than chlorine. As such, it is subject to phase-out requirements of the 1987 Montreal Protocol on Ozone Depleting Substances.

The London Amendment in 1990 added bromomethane to the list of ODS to be phased out. Phase-out began in the United States in 1993, manufactured amounts being capped at the 1991 level. All developed countries in the Montreal Protocol reduced both manufactured and imported amounts by 25% in 1999, 50% 2001, 75% 2003, 100% 2005. In 2003 the Global Environment Facility approved funds for a UNEP-UNDP joint project for methyl bromide total sector phase out in seven countries in Central Europe and Central Asia, which was due for completion in 2007.

=== Australia ===
In Australia, bromomethane is the preferred fumigant of the Department of Agriculture and Water Resources for most organic goods imported into Australia. The department conducts methyl bromide fumigation certification for both domestic and foreign fumigators who can then fumigate containers destined for Australia. A list of alternative fumigants is available for goods imported from Europe (in what's known as the BICON database), where methyl bromide fumigation has been banned. Alternatively, the department allows containers from Europe to be fumigated with methyl bromide on arrival to Australia.

=== New Zealand ===
In New Zealand, bromomethane is used as a fumigant for whole logs destined for export. Environmental groups and the Green Party oppose its use. In May 2011 the Environmental Risk Management Authority (ERMA) introduced new rules for its use which restrict the level of public exposure to the fumigant, set minimum buffer zones around fumigation sites, provide for notification to nearby residents and require users to monitor air quality during fumigations and report back to ERMA each year. All methyl bromide fumigations must use recapture technology by 2025.

=== United States ===
In the United States bromomethane is regulated as a pesticide under the Federal Insecticide, Fungicide, and Rodenticide Act (FIFRA; 7 U.S.C. 136 et seq.) and as a hazardous substance under the Resource Conservation and Recovery Act (RCRA; 42 U.S.C. 6901 et seq.), and is subject to reporting requirements under the Emergency Planning and Community Right-to-Know Act (EPCRA; 42 U.S.C. 11001 et seq.). The U.S. Clean Air Act (CAA; 42 U.S.C. 7401 et seq.). A 1998 amendment (P.L. 105-178, Title VI) conformed the Clean Air Act phase out date with that of the Montreal Protocol. While the Montreal Protocol severely restricted the use of bromomethane internationally, the United States has successfully lobbied for critical-use exemptions. Critical use exemptions allow the United States to continue using MeBr until it is scheduled to be completely phased out sometime in 2017.

=== Chile ===
Chile has phased out the use of bromomethane in traditional agriculture as of 2015, with exemption of the 100% pure formulation that is largely used for quarantine pest control and at pre-shipments of the fruit export industry.

== Alternatives ==
Alternatives to bromomethane in the agricultural field are currently in use and further alternatives are in development, including propylene oxide and furfural. For Australia, a list of alternative fumigants is available for goods imported from Europe (in what's known as the BICON database), where methyl bromide fumigation has been banned.

- Chloropicrin has been used in combination with bromomethane, and standalone is a common alternative fumigant. It has been widely used since its initial success against Verticillium dahliae in strawberry. It is a suitable alternative for fungicidal action but does not quite have BM's nematicide or herbicide efficacy, and so is commonly combined with yet another fumigant.
- 1,3-Dichloropropene replaces some of both the fungicide and nematicide effects of BM, but is not a full-efficacy replacement.
- Methyl isothiocyanate is the breakdown product/a.i. of two applied products, metam sodium and granular dazomet. MITC does not redistribute through the soil as well as BM. Requires significantly more irrigation for activation. More strongly herbicidal than BM and so often used for that purpose alone. Much smaller doses stimulate weed germination.

An alternative to bromomethane for structural termite fumigation is sulfuryl fluoride, which is a powerful greenhouse gas. This is also used in exported agricultural commodities in order to prevent the spread of invasive species.

=== Potential future alternatives ===
- Iodomethane
- Propargyl bromide
- Ozone

== Health effects ==
Brief exposure to high concentrations and prolonged inhalation of lower concentrations are problematic. Exposure levels leading to death vary from 1,600 to 60,000 ppm, depending on the duration of exposure (as a comparison exposure levels of 70 to 400 ppm of carbon monoxide cover the same spectrum of illness/death). Concentrations in the range of 60,000 ppm can be immediately fatal, while toxic effects can present following prolonged exposure to concentrations well under 1,000 ppm.

"A TLV–TWA of 1 ppm (3.89 mg/m3) is recommended for occupational exposure to methyl bromide"-ACGIH 8 hour time weighted average. Immediately Dangerous To Life or Health Concentration by NIOSH: "The revised IDLH for methyl bromide is 250 ppm based on acute inhalation toxicity data in humans [Clarke et al. 1945]. This may be a conservative value due to the lack of relevant acute toxicity data for workers exposed to concentrations above 220 ppm. [Note: NIOSH recommends as part of its carcinogen policy that the "most protective" respirators be worn for methyl bromide at any detectable concentration.]" Detectable concentration by Drager Tube is 0.5 ppm.

Respiratory, kidney, and neurological effects are of the greatest concern.

Treatment of wood packaging requires a concentration of up to 16,000 ppm.

NIOSH considers methyl bromide to be a potential occupational carcinogen as defined by the OSHA carcinogen policy [29 CFR 1990]. "Methyl bromide showed a significant dose-response relationship with prostate cancer risk."

=== Excessive exposure ===
Expression of toxicity following exposure may involve a latent period of several hours, followed by signs such as nausea, abdominal pain, weakness, confusion, pulmonary edema, and seizures. Individuals who survive the acute phase often require a prolonged convalescence. Persistent neurological deficits such as asthenia, cognitive impairment, optical atrophy, and paresthesia are frequently present after moderate to severe poisoning. Blood or urine concentrations of inorganic bromide, a bromomethane metabolite, are useful to confirm a diagnosis of poisoning in hospitalized patients or to assist in the forensic investigation of a case of fatal overdosage.

== Gallery ==
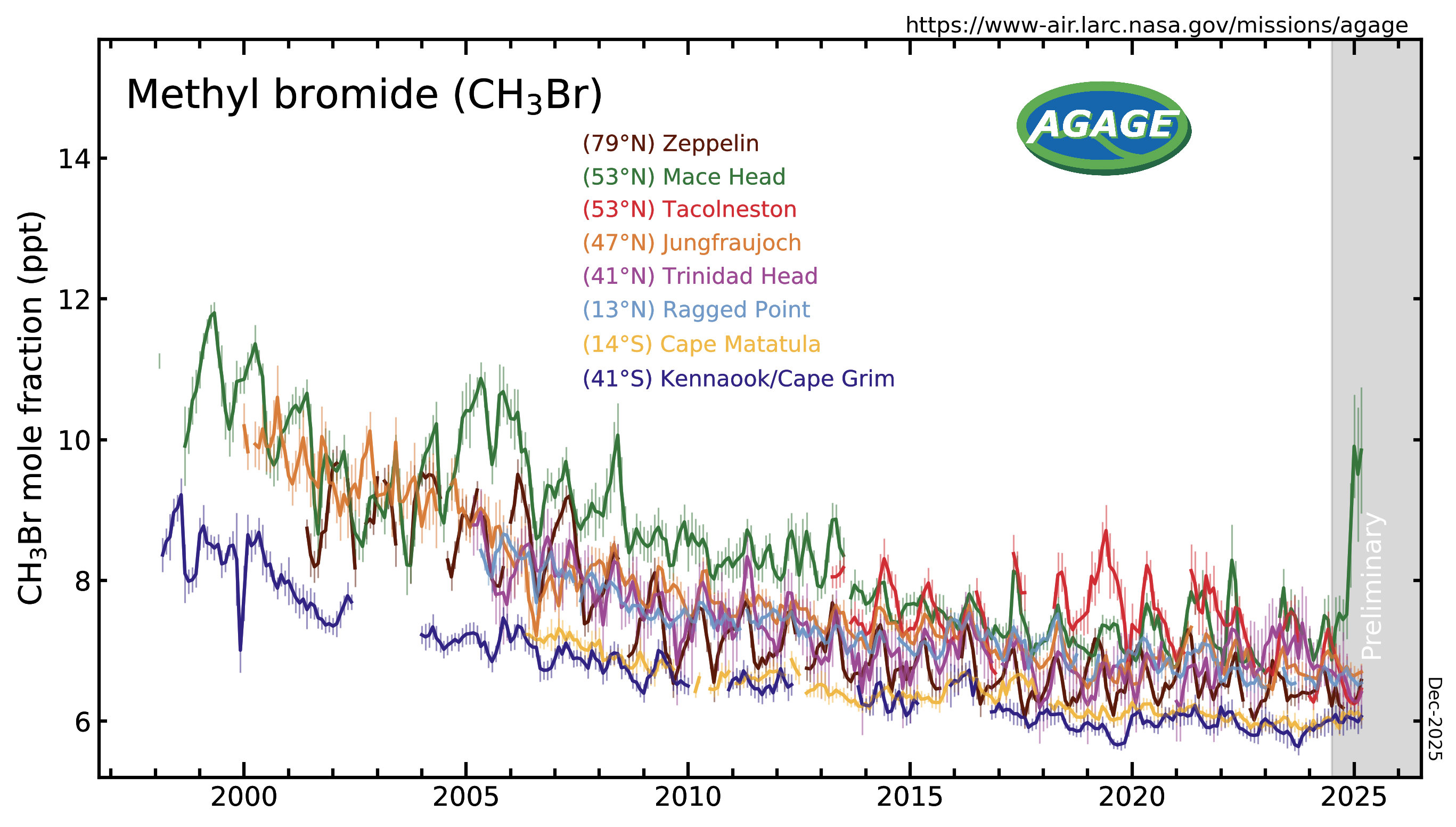
CH_{3}Br measured by the Advanced Global Atmospheric Gases Experiment (AGAGE) in the lower atmosphere (troposphere) at stations around the world. Abundances are given as pollution free monthly mean mole fractions in parts-per-trillion.

IR spectrum of bromomethane.

== See also ==
- List of highly toxic gases
- Angelita C. et al. v. California Department of Pesticide Regulation
- Bromoethane
- Bromopropane
- Bromobutane
- Bromopentane – Group of chemical compounds
- Bromohexane
- Chloromethane
- Dibromomethane
- Bromoform
- Carbon tetrabromide
