= C4H5NO2 =

The molecular formula C_{4}H_{5}NO_{2} (molar mass: 99.09 g/mol, exact mass: 99.0320 u) may refer to:

- Succinimide
- Azirinomycin
