= Aminoaldehydes and aminoketones =

Class of organic compounds

In organic chemistry, aminoaldehydes and aminoketones are organic compounds that contain an amine (:N) functional group as well as either an aldehyde (−CH=O) or ketone (>C=O) functional group. These compounds are important in biology and in chemical synthesis. Because of their bifunctional nature, they have attracted much attention from chemists.

== Tertiary amine derivatives ==
Because primary and secondary amines react with aldehydes and ketones, the most common variety of these aminocarbonyl compounds feature tertiary amines. Such compounds are produced by amination of α-haloketones and α-haloaldehydes. Examples include cathinones, methadone, molindone, pimeclone, ferruginine, and tropinone.

== Secondary amine derivatives ==
Aminoketones containing secondary amines are typically stable when the ketone is located on a ring, e.g. 4-piperidinone, triacetonamine, acridone.

== Primary amine derivatives ==
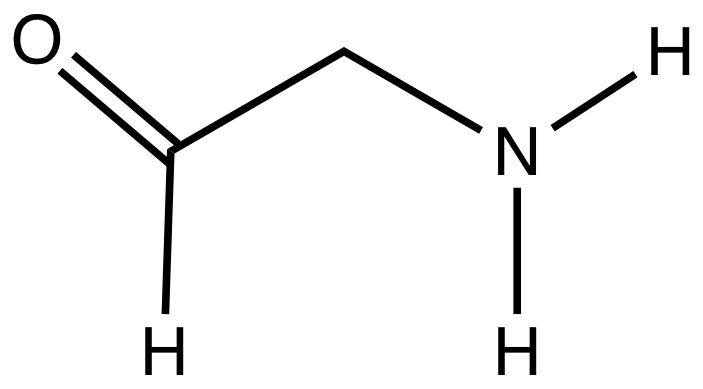
Structure of aminoacetaldehyde.

Most members of this class are unstable towards self-condensation, however some important examples do exist as intermediates in biosynthetic pathways e.g. glutamate-1-semialdehyde. The acyclic forms of certain amino sugars also qualify, for instance vancosamine. Aminoacetaldehyde, the simplest member of this subclass, is highly reactive toward self-condensation. Aminoacetaldehyde diethylacetal, (EtO)_{2}CHCH_{2}NH_{2}, is a stable analogue that is commercially available. 2-Aminobenzaldehyde with the formula C_{6}H_{4}(NH_{2})CHO is a prominent aromatic aminoaldehyde. The compound is unstable with respect to self-condensation.

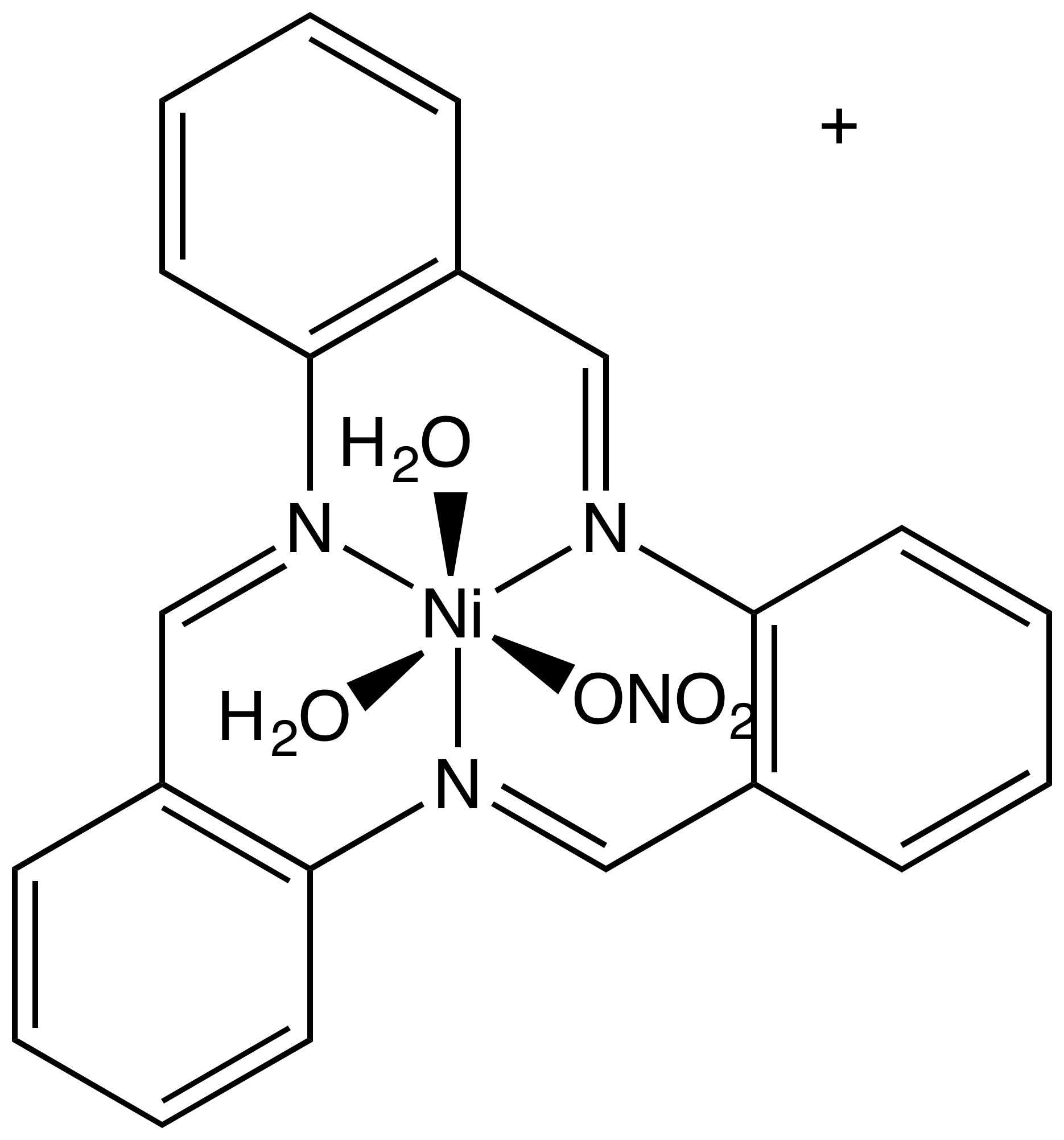
Structure of nickel-aquo nitrate complex of the ligand derived from condensation of three equivalents of 2-aminobenzaldehyde.

Aminoacetone is a prominent member of this class of compounds. It is unstable under normal laboratory conditions, but the hydrochloride [CH_{3}C(O)CH_{2}NH_{3}]Cl is readily isolable.

Aminoacetone is derived from decarboxylation of alanine. Aminoacetaldehyde is produced by the hydroxylation of taurine.
