= Azirine =

Organic ring compounds with the formula C2H3N

Names
- IUPAC name 2H-Azirine

Identifiers
CAS Number	157-16-4
3D model (JSmol)	Interactive image
Beilstein Reference	1633516
ChEBI	CHEBI:30971
ChemSpider	119750
PubChem CID	135972
CompTox Dashboard (EPA)	DTXSID60166176
- InChI: InChI=1S/C2H3N/c1-2-3-1/h1H,2H2 Key: NTJMGOWFGQXUDY-UHFFFAOYSA-N
- SMILES: C1C=N1

Properties
Chemical formula	C_{2}H_{3}N
Molar mass	41.053 g·mol^{−1}
- Except where otherwise noted, data are given for materials in their standard state (at 25 °C [77 °F], 100 kPa). Infobox references

Azirines are heterocyclic organic compounds containing a three-membered ring with two carbon atoms and one nitrogen atom, the unsaturated analogs of aziridines. Azirine, the parent compound, has two isomers: the antiaromatic 1H-azirine, containing a carbon–carbon double bond, is not stable and rearranges to the tautomeric 2H-azirine, containing a carbon–nitrogen double bond, which is at least 30 kcal·mol^{−1} lower in energy. 2H-Azirines can be considered strained imines and are isolable. They are highly reactive yet have been reported in a few natural products such as dysidazirine.

== Preparation ==
2H-Azirine is most often obtained by the thermolysis of vinyl azides. During this reaction, a nitrene is formed as an intermediate. Alternatively, they can be obtained by oxidation of the corresponding aziridine. Azirine can be generated during photolysis of isoxazole. Due to the weak N–O bond, the isoxazole ring tends to collapse under UV irradiation, rearranging to azirine.

Substituted azirines can be produced via the Neber rearrangement.

== Reactions ==
Photolysis of azirines (under 300 nm) is a very efficient way to generate nitrile ylides. These nitrile ylides are dipolar compounds and can be trapped by a variety of dipolarophiles to yield heterocyclic compounds, e.g. pyrrolines.

The strained ring system also undergoes reactions that favor ring opening and can act as a nucleophile or an electrophile.

Azirines readily hydrolyse to give aminoketones which are themselves susceptible to self-condensation.

== See also ==
- Dysidazirine, one of only a few naturally occurring azirines
- Azirinomycin
