= Aminoacetaldehyde diethylacetal =

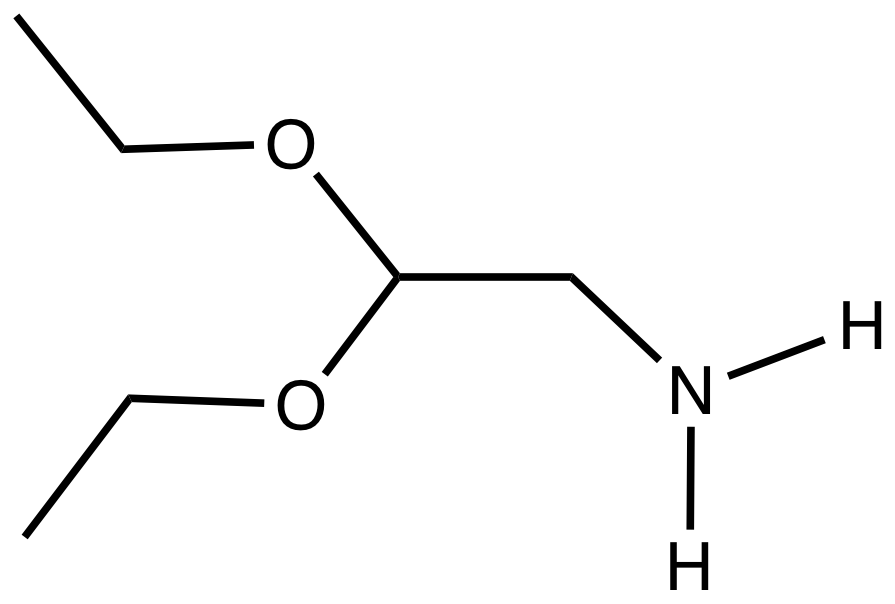

Names
- Preferred IUPAC name 2,2-Diethoxyethan-1-amine

Identifiers
CAS Number	645-36-3
3D model (JSmol)	Interactive image
ChemSpider	13857397
ECHA InfoCard	100.010.401
EC Number	211-439-4
PubChem CID	69524
UNII	658AO12BQL
CompTox Dashboard (EPA)	DTXSID4060945
- InChI: Key: HJKLEAOXCZIMPI-UHFFFAOYSA-N; InChI=1S/C6H15NO2/c1-3-8-6(5-7)9-4-2/h6H,3-5,7H2,1-2H3
- SMILES: CCOC(CN)OCC

Properties
Chemical formula	C_{6}H_{15}NO_{2}
Molar mass	133.191 g·mol^{−1}
Appearance	colorless liquid
Density	0.9152 g/cm^{3}
Melting point	−78 °C (−108 °F; 195 K)
Boiling point	163 °C (325 °F; 436 K)

Hazards
- GHS labelling
Pictograms	(GHS02: Flammable) (GHS05: Corrosive) (GHS07: Exclamation mark)
Signal word	Danger
Hazard statements	H226, H314, H315, H319, H335
Precautionary statements	P210, P233, P240, P241, P242, P243, P260, P264, P271, P280, P301+P330+P331, P302+P352, P303+P361+P353, P304+P340, P305+P351+P338, P310, P312, P321, P332+P313, P337+P313, P362, P363, P370+P378, P403+P233, P403+P235, P405, P501
- Except where otherwise noted, data are given for materials in their standard state (at 25 °C [77 °F], 100 kPa). Infobox references

Aminoacetaldehyde diethylacetal is the organic compound with the formula (EtO)_{2}CHCH_{2}NH_{2}. A colorless liquid, it is used as a surrogate for aminoacetaldehyde.

== See also ==
- Aminoaldehydes and aminoketones
