= Taurine dioxygenase =

Enzyme that catalyzes the chemical reaction

Identifiers
- EC no.: 1.14.11.17

Databases
- IntEnz: IntEnz view
- BRENDA: BRENDA entry
- ExPASy: NiceZyme view
- KEGG: KEGG entry
- MetaCyc: metabolic pathway
- PRIAM: profile
- PDB structures: RCSB PDB PDBe PDBsum
- Gene Ontology: AmiGO / QuickGO
Search
- PMC: articles
- PubMed: articles
- NCBI: proteins

Taurine dioxygenase (EC 1.14.11.17) is an enzyme that catalyzes the chemical reaction.

taurine
Fe(IV)=O
Fe(II)
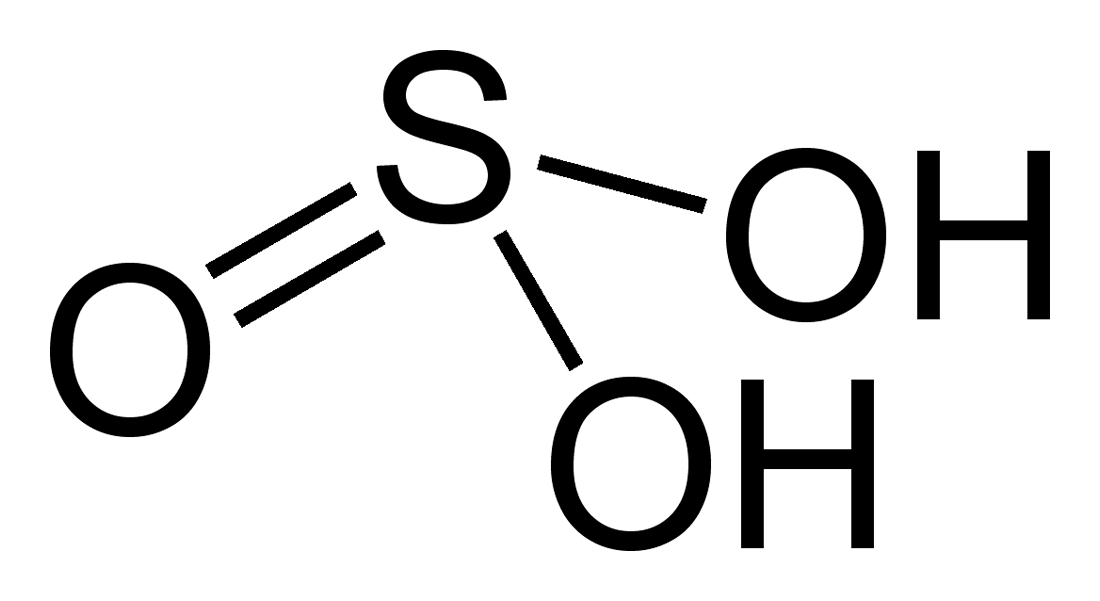
sulfurous acid
+
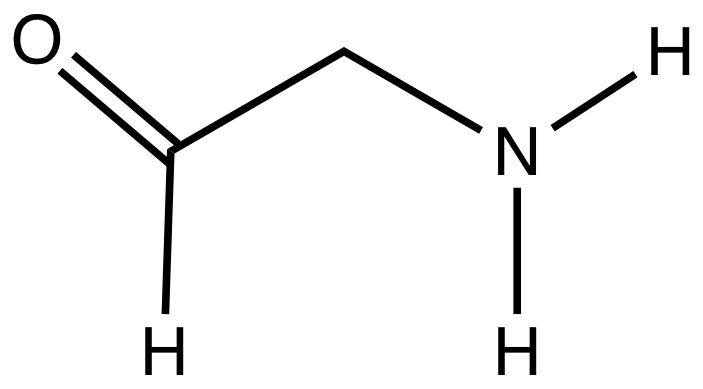
aminoacetaldehyde

It oxidises taurine using molecular oxygen, converting it to sulfite and aminoacetaldehyde.

This enzyme is an alpha-ketoglutarate-dependent hydroxylase with systematic name taurine, 2-oxoglutarate:O2 oxidoreductase (sulfite-forming). Other names in common use include 2-aminoethanesulfonate dioxygenase, and alpha-ketoglutarate-dependent taurine dioxygenase. It participates in taurine and hypotaurine metabolism.

== Structural studies ==
As of late 2007, 4 structures have been solved for this class of enzymes, with PDB accession codes 1GQW, 1GY9, 1OS7, and 1OTJ.

== Mechanism ==
The enzyme is a non-heme iron protein with ferryl active site where Fe(IV)=O is the species that transfers its oxygen to the substrate.

The mechanism requires 2-oxoglutaric acid to activate the iron oxygen complex, and this gives succinic acid and carbon dioxide when the second atom of the molecular oxygen is removed. Ascorbic acid is also required to increase the turnover number of the enzyme by reducing any iron converted to Fe(III) back to the required Fe(II).

2-oxoglutaric acid
[O]
CO_{2}
succinic acid
