= 1-Bromo-2,2-dimethylpropane =

Chemical compound

- Skeletal formula of 1-bromo-2,2-dimethylpropane

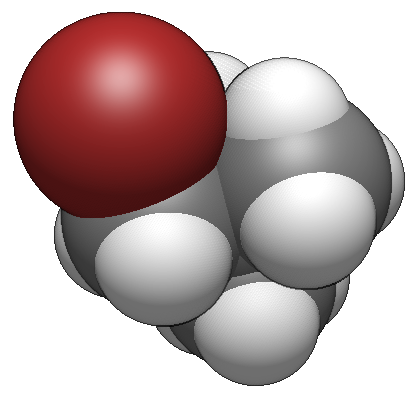
- Van der Waals space filling model of 1-bromo-2,2-dimethylpropane

Names
- Preferred IUPAC name 1-Bromo-2,2-dimethylpropane
- Other names Neopentyl bromide

Identifiers
CAS Number	630-17-1
3D model (JSmol)	Interactive image
Beilstein Reference	1730989
ChemSpider	11908
ECHA InfoCard	100.010.121
EC Number	211-132-5
PubChem CID	12415
CompTox Dashboard (EPA)	DTXSID2060886
- InChI: InChI=1S/C5H11Br/c1-5(2,3)4-6/h4H2,1-3H3 Key: CQWYAXCOVZKLHY-UHFFFAOYSA-N
- SMILES: CC(C)(C)CBr

Properties
Chemical formula	C_{5}H_{11}Br
Molar mass	151.047 g·mol^{−1}
Appearance	colorless liquid
Density	1.199 g mL^{−1}
Melting point	−105.5 °C; −157.8 °F; 167.7 K
Boiling point	105–106 °C; 221–223 °F; 378–379 K

Hazards
- GHS labelling
Pictograms	(GHS02: Flammable) (GHS07: Exclamation mark)
Hazard statements	H225, H315, H319, H335
Precautionary statements	P210, P233, P240, P241, P242, P243, P261, P264, P264+P265, P271, P280, P302+P352, P303+P361+P353, P304+P340, P305+P351+P338, P319, P321, P332+P317, P337+P317, P362+P364, P370+P378, P403+P233, P403+P235, P405, P501
NFPA 704 (fire diamond)	2 3 0
Flash point	6.7 °C; 44.0 °F; 279.8 K
- Except where otherwise noted, data are given for materials in their standard state (at 25 °C [77 °F], 100 kPa). Infobox references

1-Bromo-2,2-dimethylpropane, also known as neopentyl bromide, is an isomer of bromopentane. It is a colorless liquid.

== Extra reading ==
- Whitmore, Frank C.; Wittle, E. L.; Harriman, B. R. (June 1939). "The Preparation of Neopentyl Iodide and Neopentyl Bromide". Journal of the American Chemical Society. 61 (6): 1585–1586. doi:10.1021/ja01875a072.
- Lisowski, Carmen E.; Duncan, Juliana R.; Ranieri, Anthony J.; Heard, George L.; Setser, D. W.; Holmes, Bert E. (30 September 2010). "Isomerization of Neopentyl Chloride and Neopentyl Bromide by a 1,2-Interchange of a Halogen Atom and a Methyl Group". The Journal of Physical Chemistry A. 114 (38): 10395–10402. Bibcode:2010JPCA..11410395L. doi:10.1021/jp1047166. PMID 20809644.
- Wiley, G. A.; Hershkowitz, R. L.; Rein, B. M.; Chung, B. C. (March 1964). "Studies in Organophosphorus Chemistry. I. Conversion of Alcohols and Phenols to Halides by Tertiary Phosphine Dihalides". Journal of the American Chemical Society. 86 (5): 964–965. doi:10.1021/ja01059a073. (79% or 91% yield)
