= 2-Bromopentane =

- Skeletal formula of 2-bromopentane

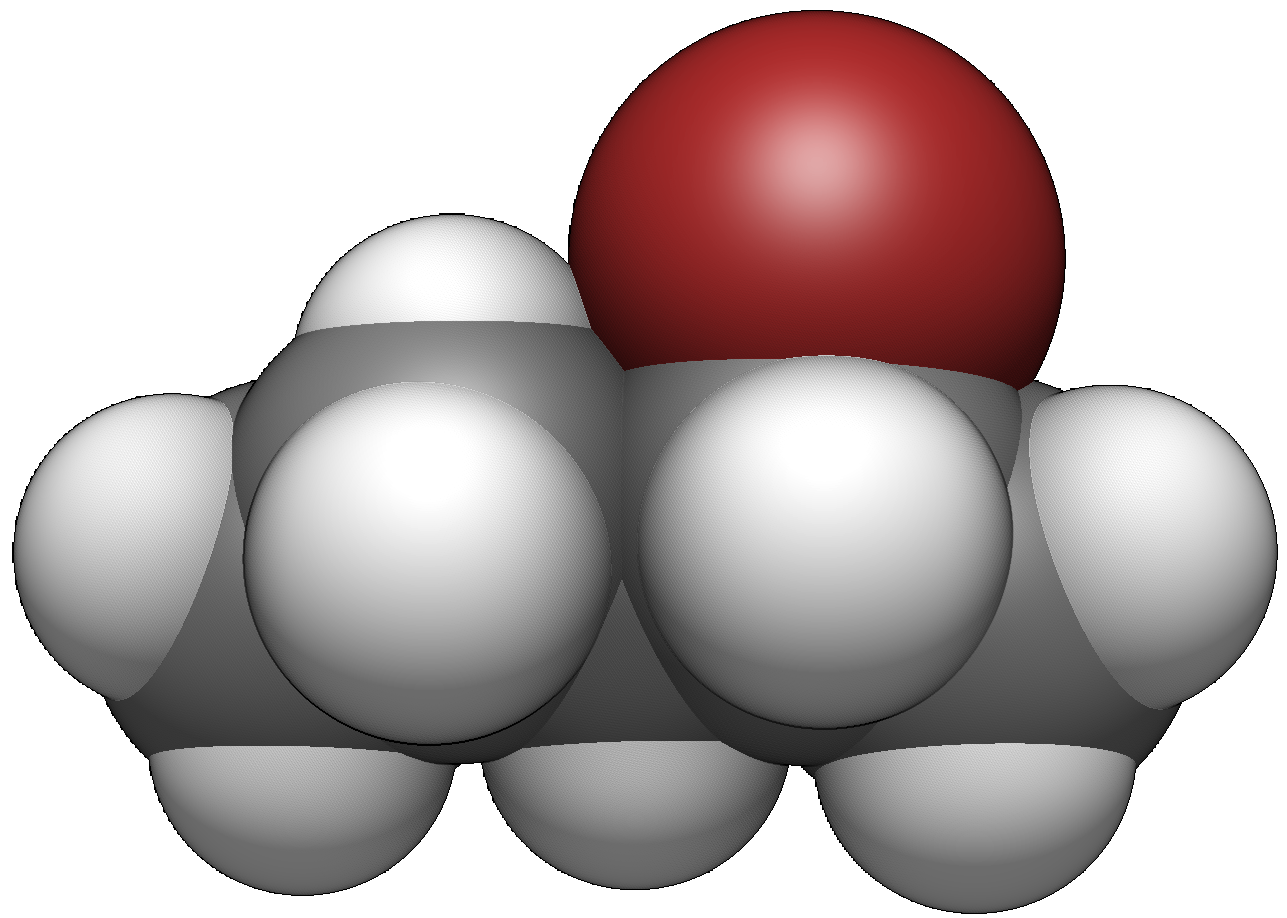
Van der Waals space filling structure of (R)-2-bromopentane
(R)-2-bromopentane
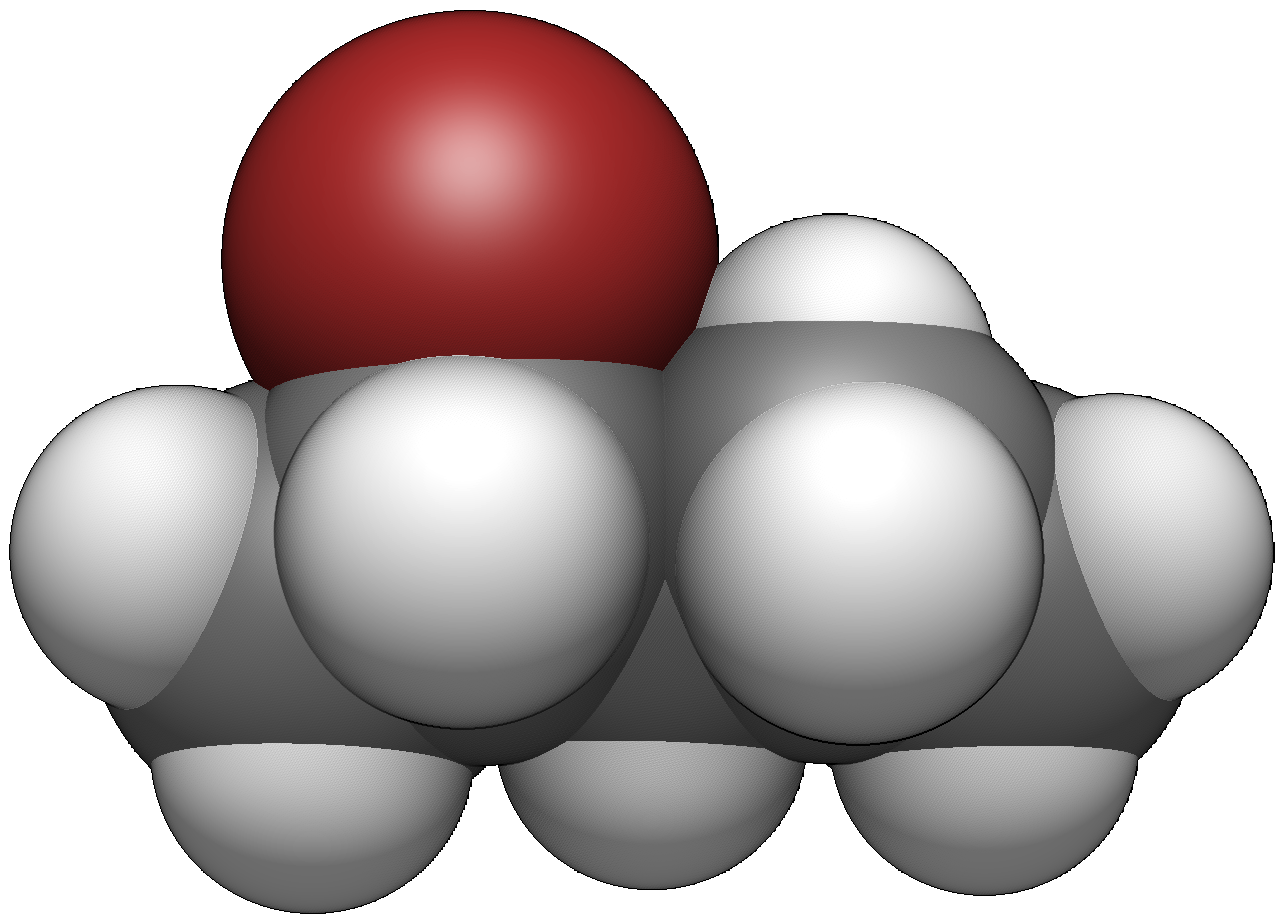
Van der Waals space filling structure of (S)-2-bromopentane
(S)-2-bromopentane

Names
- Preferred IUPAC name 2-Bromopentane
- Other names 2-Pentyl bromide

Identifiers
CAS Number	107-81-3; 29117-44-0 (R); 29882-58-4 (S)
3D model (JSmol)	Interactive image; (R): Interactive image; (S): Interactive image
Abbreviations	2-BP s-PeBr sPeBr^{s}PeBr s-AmBr sAmBr^{s}AmBr
ChemSpider	7602; 60603465 (R); 21427355 (S)
ECHA InfoCard	100.003.202
EC Number	203-521-3
PubChem CID	7890; 71446854 (R); 24884213 (S)
UN number	2343
CompTox Dashboard (EPA)	DTXSID90870456
- InChI: InChI=1S/C5H11Br/c1-3-4-5(2)6/h5H,3-4H2,1-2H3 Key: LGAJYTCRJPCZRJ-UHFFFAOYSA-N
- SMILES: CCCC(C)Br; (R): CCC[C@@H](C)Br; (S): CCC[C@H](C)Br

Properties
Chemical formula	C_{5}H_{11}Br
Molar mass	151.047 g·mol^{−1}
Appearance	colorless liquid
Density	1.208 g mL^{−1}
Boiling point	117.3 °C; 243.0 °F; 390.4 K
Vapor pressure	2.84 kPa

Hazards
- GHS labelling
Pictograms	(GHS02: Flammable) (GHS07: Exclamation mark)
Hazard statements	H225, H226, H315, H319, H335
Precautionary statements	P210, P233, P240, P241, P242, P243, P261, P264, P264+P265, P271, P280, P302+P352, P303+P361+P353, P304+P340, P305+P351+P338, P319, P321, P332+P317, P337+P317, P362+P364, P370+P378, P403+P235, P405, P501
Flash point	20.6 °C; 69.0 °F; 293.7 K
- Except where otherwise noted, data are given for materials in their standard state (at 25 °C [77 °F], 100 kPa). Infobox references

2-Bromopentane is a bromoalkane and isomer of bromopentane. It is a colorless liquid. 2-Bromopentane is chiral and thus can be obtained as either of two stereoisomers designated as (R)-2-bromopentane and (S)-2-bromopentane, or as a racemic 1:1 mixture of the two enantiomers.

== Applications ==
2-Bromopentane is an organic synthetic compound that can be used in cross-coupling reactions. It is also used as an intermediate in organic synthesis.

== Synthesis ==
2-Bromopentane, along with 3-bromopentane, may be produced by the bromination of 2-pentanol. This has historically been performed using hydrogen bromide gas, aqueous sulfuric and hydrobromic acid mixtures, and phosphorus tribromide.
