= Aminoacetaldehyde =

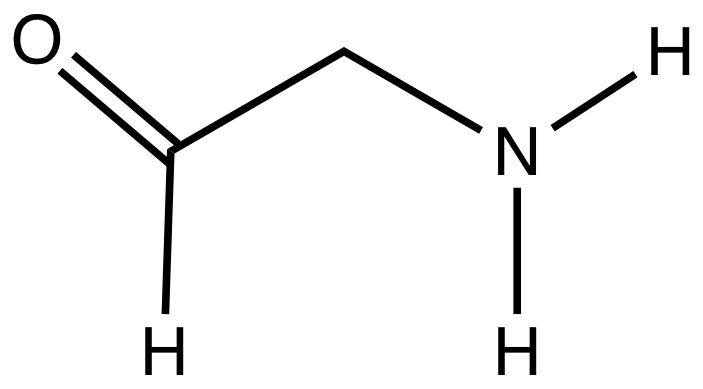

Names
- Preferred IUPAC name Aminoacetaldehyde
- Other names H-Gly-al; glycynal

Identifiers
CAS Number	6542-88-7
3D model (JSmol)	Interactive image
ChEBI	CHEBI:17628
ChEMBL	ChEMBL296723
ChemSpider	356
KEGG	C06735
PubChem CID	363
UNII	75G7022MOD
CompTox Dashboard (EPA)	DTXSID50215728
- InChI: InChI=1S/C2H5NO/c3-1-2-4/h2H,1,3H2 Key: LYIIBVSRGJSHAV-UHFFFAOYSA-N
- SMILES: C(C=O)N

Properties
Chemical formula	C_{2}H_{5}NO
Molar mass	59.068 g·mol^{−1}
- Except where otherwise noted, data are given for materials in their standard state (at 25 °C [77 °F], 100 kPa). Infobox references

Aminoacetaldehyde is the organic compound with the formula OHCCH_{2}NH_{2}. Under the usual laboratory conditions, it is unstable, tending instead to undergo self-condensation. Aminoacetaldehyde diethylacetal is a stable surrogate.

In nature, aminoacetaldehyde is produced by oxygenation of taurine catalyzed by taurine dioxygenase, which produces the sulfite H_{2}NCH_{2}CH(OH)SO_{3}^{−}.

== See also ==
- Aminoaldehydes and aminoketones
