= Bromoiodomethane =

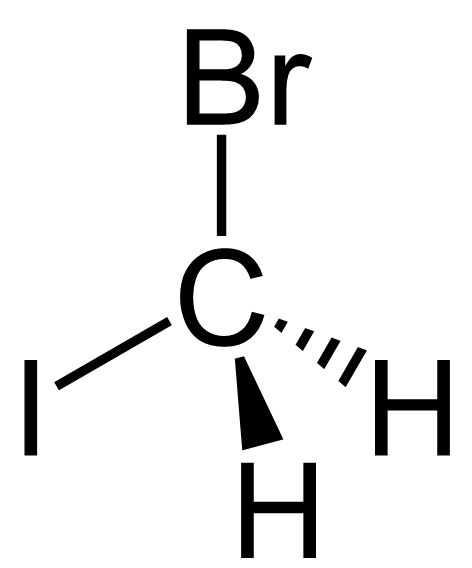
- Stereo, skeletal formula of bromoiodomethane

- Spacefill model of bromoiodomethane

Names
- Preferred IUPAC name Bromo(iodo)methane
- Other names: Bromoiodomethane; Bromomethyl iodide; Iodobromomethane

Identifiers
CAS Number	557-68-6
3D model (JSmol)	Interactive image
ChemSpider	61690
ECHA InfoCard	100.156.567
PubChem CID	68407
CompTox Dashboard (EPA)	DTXSID50204233
- InChI: InChI=1S/CH2BrI/c2-1-3/h1H2 Key: TUDWMIUPYRKEFN-UHFFFAOYSA-N
- SMILES: BrCI

Properties
Chemical formula	CH_{2}BrI
Molar mass	220.835 g·mol^{−1}
Appearance	Colourless liquid
Density	2.93 g mL^{−1}
Melting point	1 °C; 34 °F; 274 K
Boiling point	138 to 141 °C (280 to 286 °F; 411 to 414 K)
Refractive index (n_{D})	1.6382

Hazards
- GHS labelling
Pictograms	(GHS05: Corrosive) (GHS07: Exclamation mark)
Signal word	Danger
Hazard statements	H315, H318, H335
Precautionary statements	P261, P280, P305+P351+P338

Related compounds
Related alkanes	Bromomethane; Bromoethane
- Except where otherwise noted, data are given for materials in their standard state (at 25 °C [77 °F], 100 kPa). verify (what is ?) Infobox references

Bromoiodomethane is a halomethane with the formula BrCH_{2}I. It is a colorless liquid, although older samples appear yellow. The compound has been investigated as a reagent for cyclopropanation by the Simmons-Smith reaction, but diiodomethane and chloroiodomethane are preferred. It also occurs naturally as the result of microbial action.

Its critical point is at 367.85 °C and 6.3 MPa and refractive index is 1.6382 (20 °C, D).

== Additional reading ==
- Tarnovsky A. N.; Wall M.; Gustafsson M.; Lascoux N.; Sundström V.; Åkesson E. (March 2002). "Ultrafast Study of the Photodissociation of Bromoiodomethane in Acetonitrile upon 266 nm Excitation". J. Phys. Chem. A. 106 (25): 5999–6005(7). Bibcode:2002JPCA..106.5999T. doi:10.1021/jp014306j.
- Liu Y.-J.; Ajitha D.; Krogh J. W.; Tarnovsky A. N.; Lindh R. (December 2005). "Spin-Orbit Ab Initio Investigation of the Photolysis of Bromoiodomethane". ChemPhysChem. 7 (4): 955–963(9). doi:10.1002/cphc.200500654. PMID 16596616.
- Zheng, X.; Phillips, D. L. (August 2000). "Photoisomerization reaction of CH2BrI following A-band and B-band photoexcitation in the solution phase: Transient resonance Raman observation of the iso-CH2I-Br photoproduct". J. Chem. Phys. 113 (8): 3194–3203(10). Bibcode:2000JChPh.113.3194Z. doi:10.1063/1.1286920. hdl:10722/42350.
- Liu K.; Zhao H.; Wang C.; Zhang A.; Ma S.; Li Z. (January 2005). "A theoretical study of bond selective photochemistry in CH_{2}BrI". J. Chem. Phys. 122 (4): 044310. Bibcode:2005JChPh.122d4310L. doi:10.1063/1.1835955. PMID 15740251.
