= 2,4,6-Triisopropylbenzenesulfonyl azide =

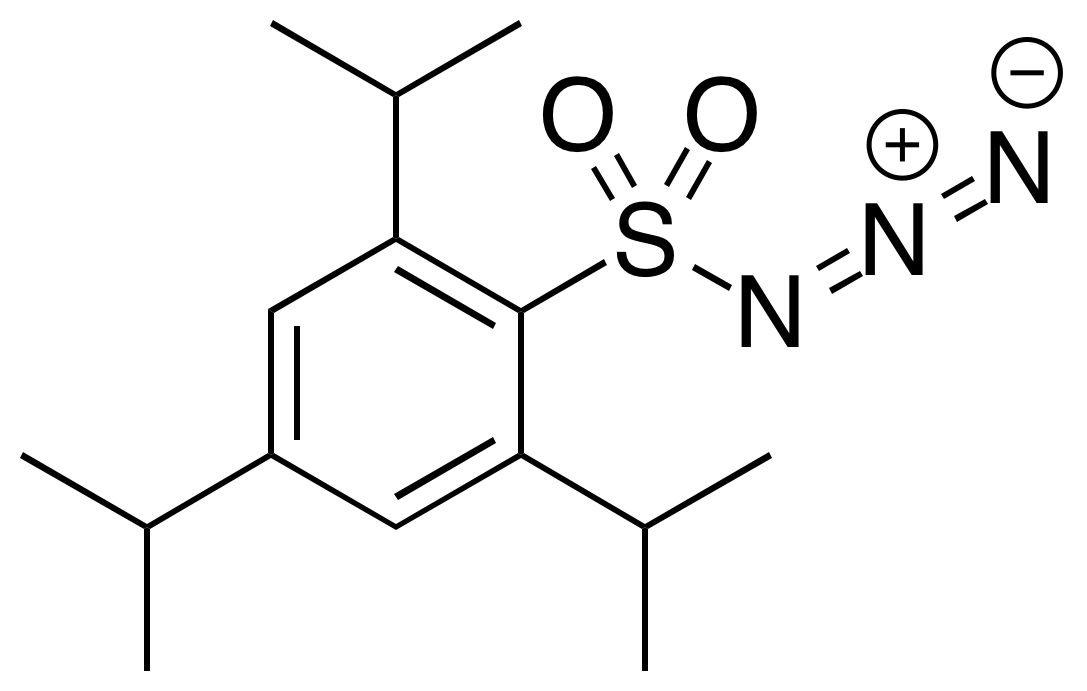

Names
- Preferred IUPAC name 2,4,6-Tri(propan-2-yl)benzene-1-sulfonyl azide

Identifiers
CAS Number	36982-84-0
3D model (JSmol)	Interactive image
ChEMBL	ChEMBL1995382
ChemSpider	2391566
ECHA InfoCard	100.124.728
EC Number	609-323-7
PubChem CID	371707
CompTox Dashboard (EPA)	DTXSID80327323
- InChI: InChI=1S/C15H23N3O2S/c1-9(2)12-7-13(10(3)4)15(14(8-12)11(5)6)21(19,20)18-17-16/h7-11H,1-6H3 Key: AEMWUHCKKDPRSK-UHFFFAOYSA-N
- SMILES: CC(C)C1=CC(=C(C(=C1)C(C)C)S(=O)(=O)N=[N+]=[N-])C(C)C

Properties
Chemical formula	C_{15}H_{23}N_{3}O_{2}S
Molar mass	309.43 g·mol^{−1}
Melting point	39–44 °C (102–111 °F; 312–317 K)

Hazards
- GHS labelling
Pictograms	(GHS01: Explosive) (GHS06: Toxic)
Signal word	Danger
Hazard statements	H241, H301
Precautionary statements	P210, P234, P240, P261, P264, P264+P265, P270, P271, P280, P301+P316, P302+P352, P304+P340, P305+P351+P338, P319, P321, P330, P332+P317, P337+P317, P362+P364, P370+P380+P375+P378, P403, P403+P233, P405, P410, P411, P420, P501
- Except where otherwise noted, data are given for materials in their standard state (at 25 °C [77 °F], 100 kPa). Infobox references

2,4,6-Triisopropylbenzenesulfonyl azide (trisyl azide) is an organic chemical used as a reagent to supply azide for electrophilic amination reactions, such as for the asymmetric synthesis of unnatural amino acids. Introduction of an azide on the α carbon of carboxylic acid derivatives using trisyl azide is an efficient alternative to electrophilic halogenation followed by nucleophilic substitution using anionic azide. Using an oxazolidinone as chiral auxiliary typically gives good induction of the stereochemistry at the α position. Subsequent reduction converts the α-azide to an α-amine.

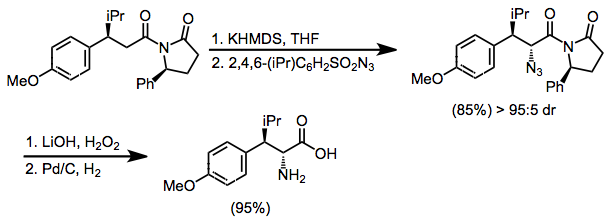
