= Streptomyces aureus =

Scientific classification
- Domain: Bacteria
- Kingdom: Bacillati
- Phylum: Actinomycetota
- Class: Actinomycetes
- Order: Streptomycetales
- Family: Streptomycetaceae
- Genus: Streptomyces
- Species: S. aureus

Binomial name
- Streptomyces aureus Manfio et al. 2003

Type strain
- AS 4.1833, B7319, CGMCC 4.1833, CIP 108188, DSM 41785, JCM 12605, NBRC 100912, NCIMB 13927

Species of bacterium

Streptomyces aureus is a bacterium species from the genus of Streptomyces which has been isolated from soil from the United Kingdom. Streptomyces aureus produces azirinomycin and thiostrepton.

== See also ==
- List of Streptomyces species
