= Bromine cycle =

Biogeochemical cycle of bromine

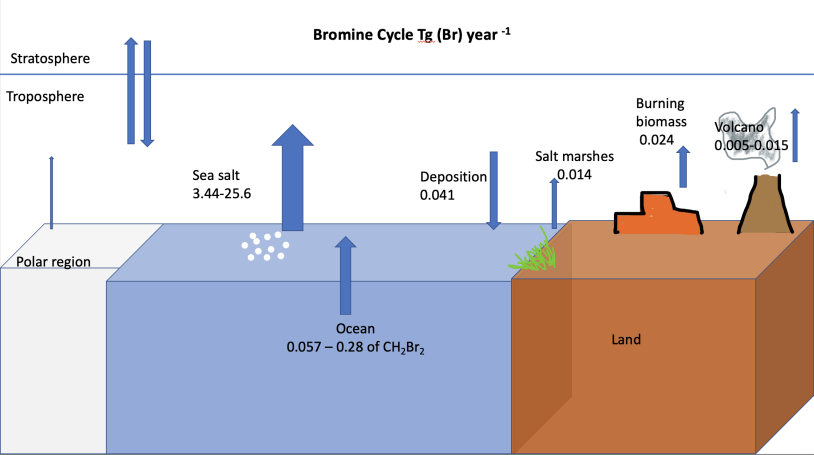
Bromine cycles throughout the ocean, land, and between the stratosphere and troposphere layers of the atmosphere. The major sources are sea salts and the ocean, volcanos, biomass burning, polar regions, and salt deposits. The major sink of bromine is deposition. Image modified from

The bromine cycle is a biogeochemical cycle of bromine through the atmosphere, biosphere, and hydrosphere. Bromine has natural and anthropogenic sources, impacting each sphere as bromine is stored, released, or taken up. Ozone depletion and health hazards to humans, animals, and plants are effects of bromine throughout the environment.

== Sources ==
=== Natural sources ===
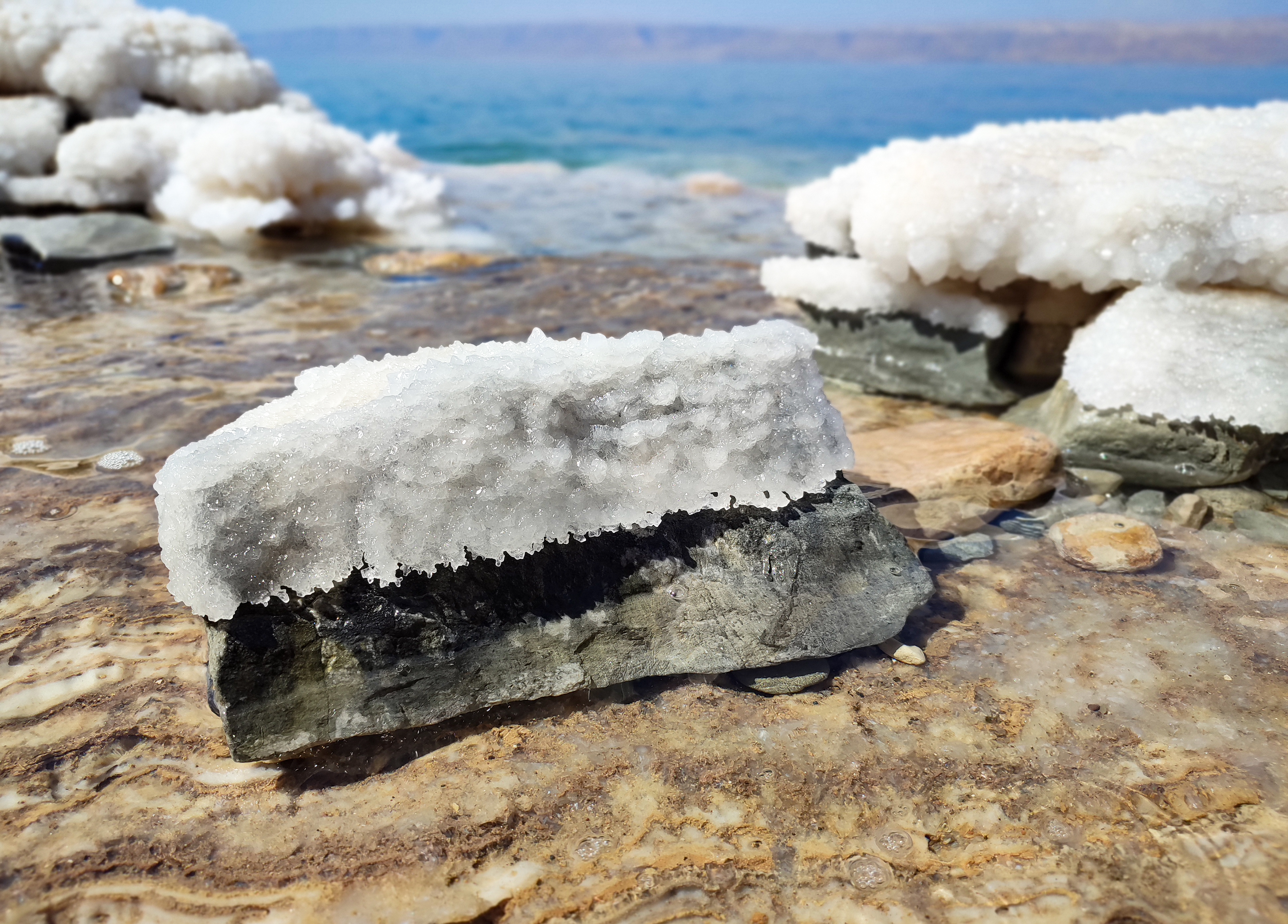
Salt deposits in the Dead Sea

Bromine is present naturally as bromide salts in evaporite deposits. Bromine is also present in soils and marine algae that synthesize organic bromine compounds. Other natural sources of bromine come from polar ice and snow, salt lakes, and volcanoes.

The primary natural source of bromine to the atmosphere is sea spray aerosols. Oceans contain small amounts of bromine due to waves perturbing gas bubbles containing bromine, as well as marine biota producing bromine containing compounds. The lifetime of bromine from sea spray aerosols is determined by the time it takes for photolysis to release bromine from sea spray aerosols to bromine in the gas phase. Additionally, the lifetime of bromine depends on the rate of deposition of sea spray aerosols, which can shorten the lifetime of bromine in the atmosphere. Smaller fluxes originate from volcanic emissions, releasing HBr and BrO during passive degassing and explosion events, and biomass burning.

The primary atmospheric sinks are sea spray deposition and photochemical reactions, which release gaseous bromine.

=== Anthropogenic sources and uses ===
Bromine is used in flame retardants, pesticides mostly in the form of CHBr_{3}, pharmaceuticals, mining and oil drilling, lighter and gasoline fuels, antiknocking agents, and water purification methods. The organic form of this element is used as flame retardants commercially and in pesticides. These sources are important as they have been identified to increase the depletion of the stratospheric ozone layer. Some countries use bromine to treat drinking water, similar to chlorination. Bromine is also present as impurities emitted from cooling towers.

== Bromine in the atmosphere ==
Bromine is released into the atmosphere through a variety of sources. Once bromine is in a gaseous state in the atmosphere, photolysis and chemical reactions can break apart compounds containing bromine or form new bromine containing compounds. Bromine can quickly cycle between gas and particle phase throughout the atmosphere. Due to the quick cycling the main loss mechanisms include dry and wet deposition. Deposition allows bromine to be taken out of the atmosphere and move to the lithosphere and hydrosphere.

Background concentrations of bromine containing compounds CHBr_{3} and CH_{2}Br_{2} are 1-2 ppt.

=== Tropospheric O_{3} depletion ===
Bromine is important to the ozone balance of the atmosphere. Bromine can react with ozone to produce BrO and O_{2}. BrO has the ability to photolyze back to Br and O_{3} or BrO can react to HO_{2} to form HOBr. HOBr readily cycles to the aqueous phase. In high NO_{x} areas, BrO can react with NO to produce Br and NO_{2}. This reaction releases Br back into the atmosphere where it can continue to destroy ozone. These reactions rely on sunlight, so ozone is depleted at a greater rate in the summer months.

$$\ce{Br + O3 -> BrO + O2}$$
$$\ce{BrO + hv ->[O2] Br + O3}$$
$$\ce{BrO + HO2 -> HBrO + O2}$$
$$\ce{BrO + NO -> Br + NO2}$$

The bromine explosion reaction seen below is of concern as two Br radicals are produced through these reactions from one starting Br radical. This increases the amount of Br available to react with ozone. This reaction converts HO_{x} to BrO_{x}.

$$\ce{Br + HO2 + Br^-/HBr (surface) + hv -> 2 Br + OH^-/H2O}$$

Bromine cycling and interactions with ozone are dependent on VOC and NO_{x} concentrations. Research and models suggest bromine contributes to 5-15% of tropospheric ozone layer losses. These reactions deplete the ozone within the atmosphere, as well as alter the oxidation potential of atmosphere.

=== Stratospheric O_{3} depletion ===
Winter sea ice is a significant atmospheric contribution of bromine, especially as polar regions were a significant location to understand halogen influence in the troposphere. Organic bromine gases such as CH_{3}Br, CH_{2}Br_{2}, CH_{2}IBr are emitted by microorganisms in sea ice and snow at ten-fold higher rates than from other environments. Additionally, these gases are a source of bromine in the stratosphere. In polar areas, decreasing sea ice due to melting releases bromine and at the Arctic and Antarctic boundary layer. Polar Stratospheric Clouds (PSC) also play a role in the availability of bromine in the stratosphere. PSCs can act as surfaces for reactions to occur on, allowing for bromine to become activated Br radicals, which are reactive with other compounds, including ozone. Br radicals in the stratosphere react with ozone to form BrO, which can further react with HO_{x}, ClO_{x}, or O, destroying stratospheric ozone.

== Bromine in soils ==
Bromine can be stored within the soils and vegetation until it is released into the atmosphere or washed into rivers and oceans. Bacteria release Br^{-} into the water in the soils and sediments through respiration, however, carbon content of the soil can influence the concentration of Br^{-}. Limited adsorption in soils and sediments mean Br^{-} is able to move thought soils and sediments easily. Since Br^{-} is very mobile, Br^{-} can easily be washed away with groundwater. Landfills can hold sources of bromine, which can be transported through runoff from precipitation and liquids within the landfill. Runoff from landfills can penetrate soils, which eventually can get into rivers, oceans, and other water sources. In efforts to remove bromine containing compounds in the soils, various methods including soil washing, biological mediation, thermal degradation, and other emerging methods have been tested and utilized.

== Bromine in the oceans ==
As seen above, Br^{-} can be stored in soils, however, the concentration is much lower than the amount of Br^{-} in the oceans. The ocean provides a large reservoir for Br^{-} ions in the aqueous phase. The major reason for the difference between land and ocean storage is the deposition of Br^{-} onto sea salt aerosols. Organisms in the oceans utilize bromine containing compounds to help defend against predation and grazing. While some organisms utilize bromine, removal of bromine containing compounds in the oceans has occurred through three types of methods: membrane, electrochemical, and adsorption methods.
