= 1-Bromopentane =

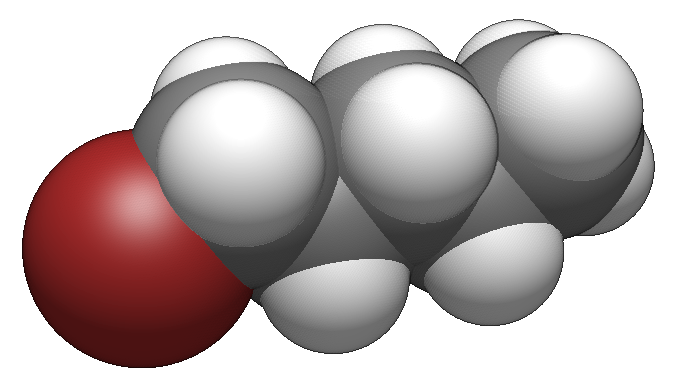

Names
- Preferred IUPAC name 1-Bromopentane
- Other names: Amyl bromide; n-Amyl bromide; Pentyl bromide

Identifiers
CAS Number	110-53-2
3D model (JSmol)	Interactive image
Abbreviations	1-BP; PeBr n-PeBr nPeBr^{n}PeBr; AmBr n-AmBr nAmBr^{n}AmBr
ChEBI	CHEBI:47130
ChEMBL	ChEMBL155850
ChemSpider	7766
ECHA InfoCard	100.003.434
EC Number	203-776-0
PubChem CID	8057
UNII	Z2S4R599P0
UN number	1993
CompTox Dashboard (EPA)	DTXSID3049203
- InChI: InChI=1S/C5H11Br/c1-2-3-4-5-6/h2-5H2,1H3 Key: YZWKKMVJZFACSU-UHFFFAOYSA-N
- SMILES: CCCCCBr

Properties
Chemical formula	C_{5}H_{11}Br
Molar mass	151.047 g·mol^{−1}
Appearance	Colorless liquid
Density	1.22 g·cm^{−3} (20 °C)
Boiling point	129.8 °C (265.6 °F; 402.9 K)
Vapor pressure	9.39 mmHg (25 °C)

Hazards
- GHS labelling
Pictograms	(GHS02: Flammable) (GHS07: Exclamation mark) (GHS09: Environmental hazard)
Signal word	Warning
Hazard statements	H226, H315, H319, H335, H411
Precautionary statements	P210, P233, P240, P241, P242, P243, P261, P264, P264+P265, P271, P273, P280, P302+P352, P303+P361+P353, P304+P340, P305+P351+P338, P319, P321, P332+P317, P337+P317, P362+P364, P370+P378, P391, P403+P233, P403+P235, P405, P501
- Except where otherwise noted, data are given for materials in their standard state (at 25 °C [77 °F], 100 kPa). Infobox references

1-Bromopentane or amyl bromide is a bromoalkane and isomer of bromopentane. It is a colorless liquid. It is found as a natural product in Fucus vesiculosus.

== Preparation ==
Most 1-bromoalkanes are prepared by free-radical addition of hydrogen bromide to the 1-alkene, which is 1-pentene in the case of 1-bromopentane. These conditions lead to anti-Markovnikov addition, giving the 1-bromo derivative.

It is also formed by the reaction of 1-pentanol with hydrogen bromide.

== See also ==
- Bromopentane
