= Dimethyldiethoxysilane =

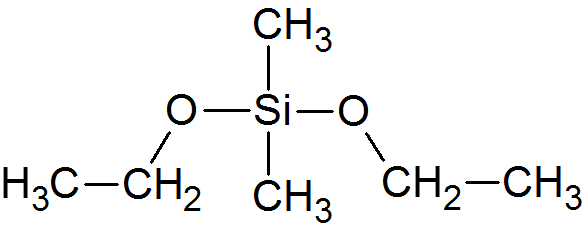

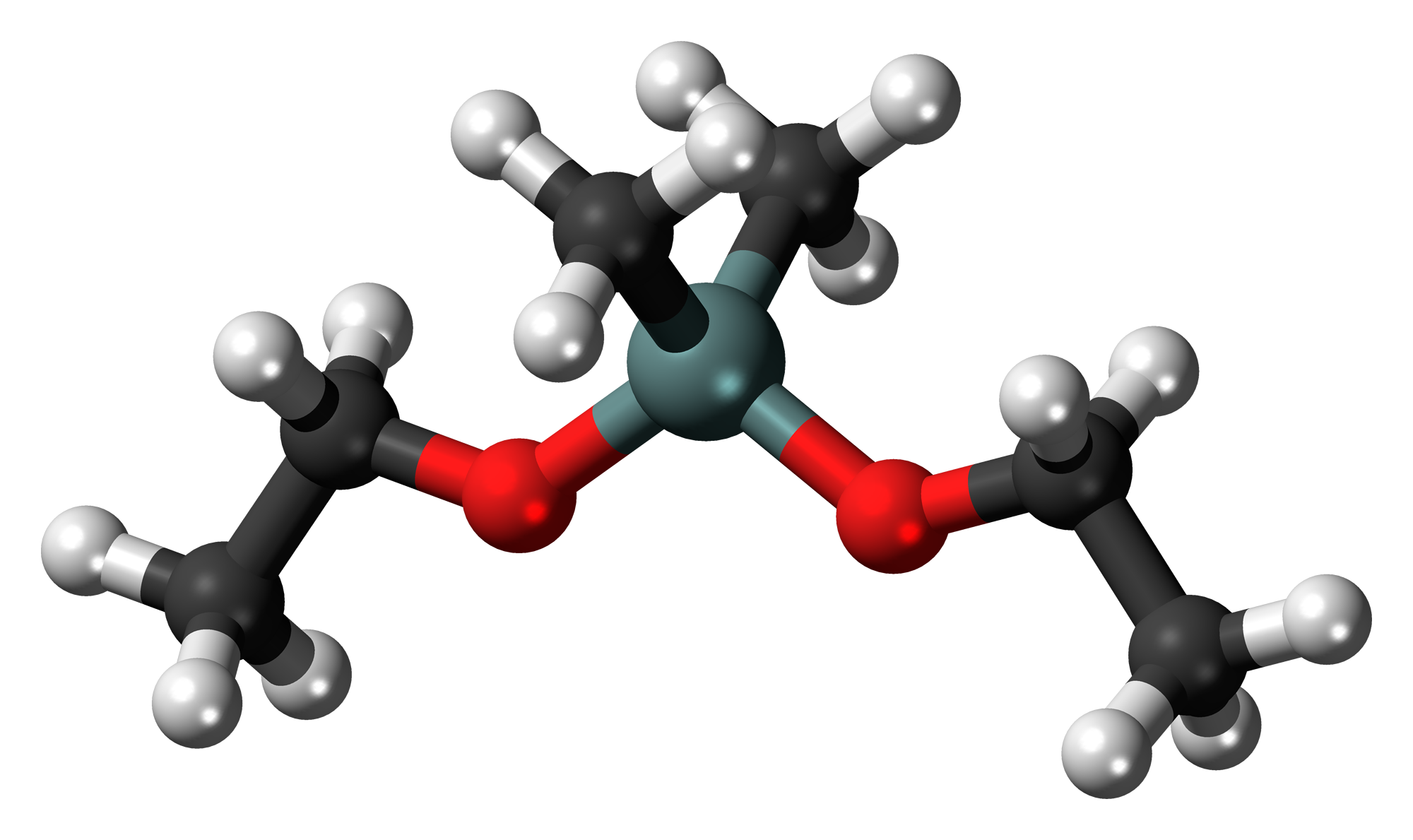

Names
- Preferred IUPAC name Diethoxydi(methyl)silane

Identifiers
CAS Number	78-62-6
3D model (JSmol)	Interactive image; Interactive image
Abbreviations	DMDEOS
Beilstein Reference	1736110
ChemSpider	56117
ECHA InfoCard	100.001.025
EC Number	201-127-6
PubChem CID	62322
RTECS number	VV3590000
UNII	I3931J3ZJ2
UN number	2380
CompTox Dashboard (EPA)	DTXSID6052538
- InChI: InChI=1S/C6H16O2Si/c1-5-7-9(3,4)8-6-2/h5-6H2,1-4H3 Key: YYLGKUPAFFKGRQ-UHFFFAOYSA-N; InChI=1/C6H16O2Si/c1-5-7-9(3,4)8-6-2/h5-6H2,1-4H3 Key: YYLGKUPAFFKGRQ-UHFFFAOYAK
- SMILES: O(CC)[Si](OCC)(C)C; O(CC)[Si](OCC)(C)C

Properties
Chemical formula	C_{6}H_{16}O_{2}Si
Molar mass	148.277 g·mol^{−1}
Appearance	Colourless liquid
Density	0.865 g cm^{−3}
Melting point	−87 °C (−125 °F; 186 K)
Boiling point	114 °C (237 °F; 387 K)
Solubility	soluble in carbon tetrachloride
- Except where otherwise noted, data are given for materials in their standard state (at 25 °C [77 °F], 100 kPa). verify (what is ?) Infobox references

Dimethyldiethoxysilane, sometimes abbreviated DMDEOS or DMDES, is an organosilicon compound. DMDEOS is a precursor in the production of the silicone polymer polydimethylsiloxane (PDMS).

DMDEOS is an intermediate silane useful for blocking hydroxyl and amino groups in organic synthesis reactions. This silylating step allows subsequent reactions to be carried out which would be adversely affected by the presence of active hydrogen in the hydroxyl or amine groups. Following the reaction step, hydroxyl or amine groups blocked with DMDEOS may be recovered by a hydrolysis procedure. DMDEOS is also used for preparing hydrophobic and release materials as well as enhancing flow of powders.
