= Neber rearrangement =

Chemical reaction

Named after	Peter Neber
Reaction type	Rearrangement reaction

Identifiers
RSC ontology ID	RXNO:0000189

The Neber rearrangement, named after the German chemistry professor Peter Neber, is the base-promoted rearrangement of an oxime sulfonate or similarly electron-deficient imine derivative to a 2H-azirine. The azirine can be converted to an α-amino ketone or under acidic aqueous conditions or an α-amino ketal under basic conditions with alcohols. The related Beckmann rearrangement is a side reaction to the Neber rearrangement that becomes predominant under acidic conditions.

General Neber Rearrangement

== Reaction mechanism ==
The Neber rearrangement begins when a strong base, commonly an alkoxide, deprotonates the carbon α to an oxime sulfonate. The resulting aza-allyl anion then decomposes through intramolecular nucleophilic attack to displace the sulfonate anion and form the azirine:

Neber Rearrangement Mechanism

Conversion to an amino-carbonyl compound is then completed through imine hydrolysis.

Regioselectivity in a ketoxime is governed by the relative acidity of the two α positions, not the E/Z geometry of the oxime, due to isomerization via the aza-allyl anion intermediate:

Neber Rearrangement Mechanism

The aza-allyl anion intermediate also leads to racemization when using substrates with α-stereocenters.

== Synthetic applications ==
The rearrangement most commonly starts with the sulfonic acid ester of an oxime but in cases where the acidity of the α-position is to low, the use of the N,N,N-trimethylhydrazonium salts is preferred and has been shown to proceed under similar conditions and yield.

Neber Rearrangement Starting Materials

The Neber rearrangement has been employed in the context of natural product synthesis as illustrated in the synthesis of dragamicidin. It has also been used at large scale in the synthesis of a pan-JAK inhibitor.

Neber Rearrangement in Natural Product Synthesis

Large Scale Neber Rearrangement

Examples of asymmetric Neber rearrangements have recently appeared, promoted by chiral phase transfer catalysts as well as chiral Brønsted bases like cinchona alkaloids and chiral thioureas. The observation of asymmetric induction under these conditions is frequently cited as supporting the proposed stepwise mechanism via the aza-allyl anion.

Asymmetric Neber Rearrangement
