= Butyl mercaptan =

Butyl mercaptan may refer to:

- Butanethiol (n-butyl mercaptan)
- tert-Butylthiol (t-butyl mercaptan)
