= Diisobutylamine =

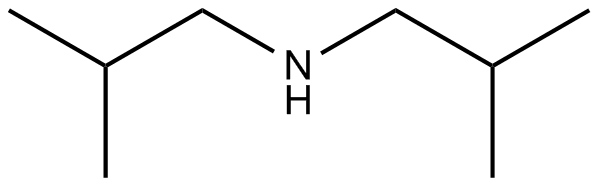

Names
- IUPAC name N-isobutyl-2-methylpropan-1-amine
- Other names 2-Methyl-N-(2-methylpropyl)-1-propanamine

Identifiers
CAS Number	110-96-3
3D model (JSmol)	Interactive image
Beilstein Reference	1209251
ChemSpider	7794
ECHA InfoCard	100.003.473
EC Number	203-819-3
PubChem CID	8085
RTECS number	TX1750000
UNII	T18Y0A819S
UN number	UN2361
CompTox Dashboard (EPA)	DTXSID5025079
- InChI: Key: NJBCRXCAPCODGX-UHFFFAOYSA-N; InChI=1/C8H19N/c1-7(2)5-9-6-8(3)4/h7-9H,5-6H2,1-4H3
- SMILES: CC(C)CNCC(C)C

Properties
Chemical formula	C_{8}H_{19}N
Molar mass	129.243 g/mol
Appearance	colorless liquid
Density	0.74 g/mL
Melting point	−77 °C (−107 °F; 196 K)
Boiling point	139 °C (282 °F; 412 K)
Solubility in water	5 g/L (20 °C)
Vapor pressure	0.972 kPa

Thermochemistry
Std enthalpy of formation (Δ_{f}H^{⦵}_{298})	−1.387 kJ/g
Std enthalpy of combustion (Δ_{c}H^{⦵}_{298})	14 kJ/g

Hazards
- Occupational safety and health (OHS/OSH)
Main hazards	Flammable, corrosive; highly toxic
- GHS labelling
Pictograms	(GHS02: Flammable) (GHS05: Corrosive) (GHS06: Toxic)
Signal word	Warning
Hazard statements	H226, H301, H302, H314, H412
Precautionary statements	P210, P273, P280, P303+P361+P353, P304+P340+P310, P305+P351+P338
NFPA 704 (fire diamond)	3 3 0
Flash point	29.44 °C (84.99 °F; 302.59 K)
Autoignition temperature	290 °C (554 °F; 563 K)
Explosive limits	0.9-6.3%
- Lethal dose or concentration (LD, LC)
LD_{50} (median dose)	100 — 145 mg/kg
- Except where otherwise noted, data are given for materials in their standard state (at 25 °C [77 °F], 100 kPa). Infobox references

Diisobutylamine is an organic compound with the formula ((CH_{3})_{2}CHCH_{2})_{2}NH. Classified as a secondary amine, the molecule contains two isobutyl groups. This colorless liquid is a weak base that is useful as an inhibitor of bacterial growth, as a precursor to various fertilizers, and a corrosion inhibitor.

== Applications ==
=== Environmental ===
Diisobutylamine has been used in water flooding operations to control the growth of sulfate reducing bacteria. When water was treated with low concentrations of diisobutylamine, the microorganisms usually present were killed. This has wide environmental impacts, because even microorganisms resistant to normal bactericides were removed from the water by the diisobutylamine.

Diisobutylamine is also used as a precursor to various fertilizers, and it is produced when plants or agents in soil break down butylate fertilizers.

=== Industrial ===
It is a precursor to the herbicide called butylate.

It is used as an agent to minimize corrosion in processes involving hydrocarbon streams which contain residual ammonia or amines. Being more basic, diisobutylamine reacts preferentially with any mineral acids in the stream (i.e. HCl). Also because diisobutylamine is more basic, its conjugate acid is less acidic, leading to a less corrosive salt formed.

Another use of diisobutylamine is in preventing corrosion and cleaning surfaces containing titanium nitride (i.e. semiconductors in computer chips, solar panels, bioMEMS, etc.). When mixed with an oxidizing agent, water, and a borate species, the mixture can clean particles, residues, metal ion contaminants, and organic contaminants all without damaging the low-k dielectrics.

Diisobutylamine has also been used to help improve storage conditions of fuel oils. Commercial fuel oils are often subject to discoloration or formation of insoluble sludge during storage which causes a loss of value. However, when stored with amine salts containing diisobutylamine, the change in color or formation of sludge of the oil is significantly reduced.

Plastic polymers treated with basic species including diisobutylamine show rapid decrosslinking of the polymer network. This suggests that reworkable polymer materials could be formed that could easily be degraded and recycled.

== Reactions ==
Diisobutylamine reacts with arylphosphonic dichlorides to give arylphosphonic amines.

Diisobutylamine reacts with dimethyldioxirane to give diisobutylhydroxylamine, as typical for oxidation of secondary amines to give hydroxylamines.
