= Bromoethane =

Skeletal formula of bromoethane
Skeletal formula of bromoethane with all explicit hydrogens added
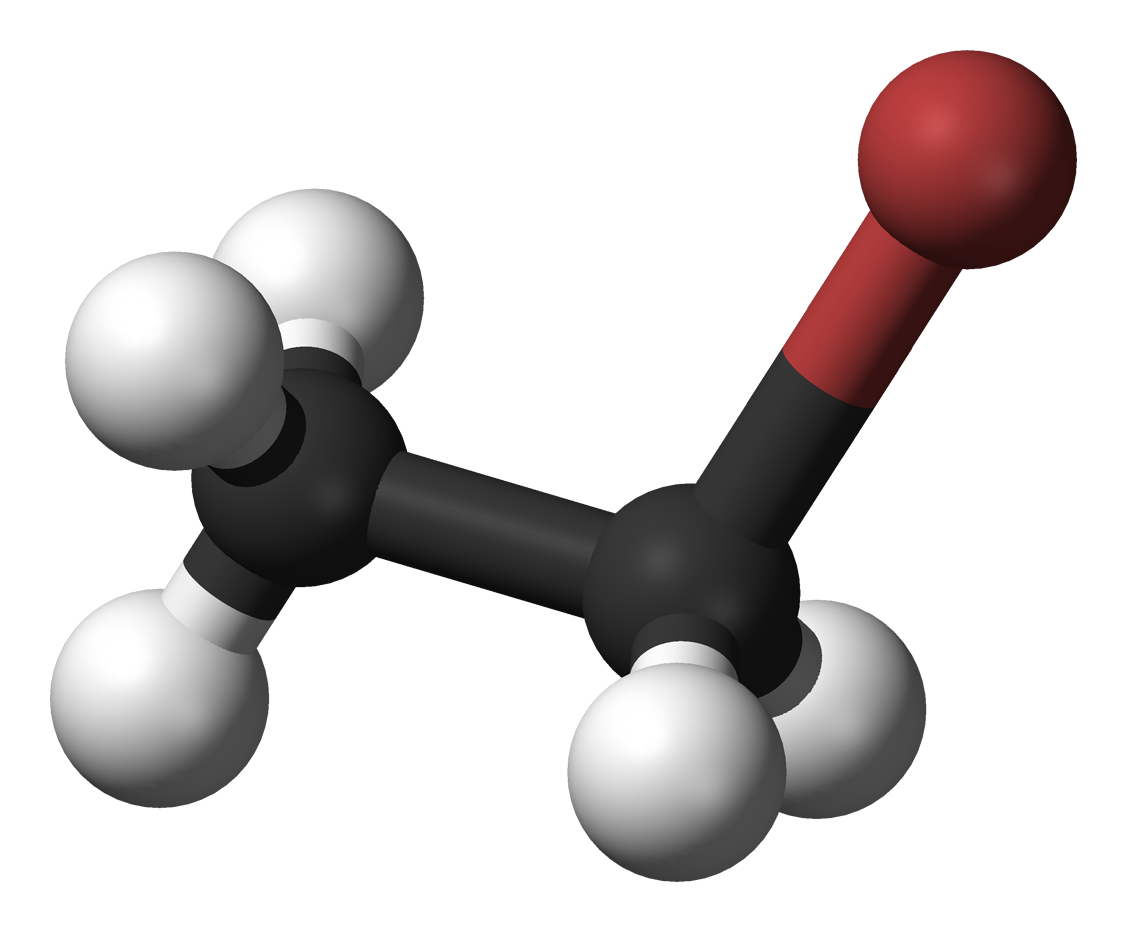
Ball and stick model of bromoethane
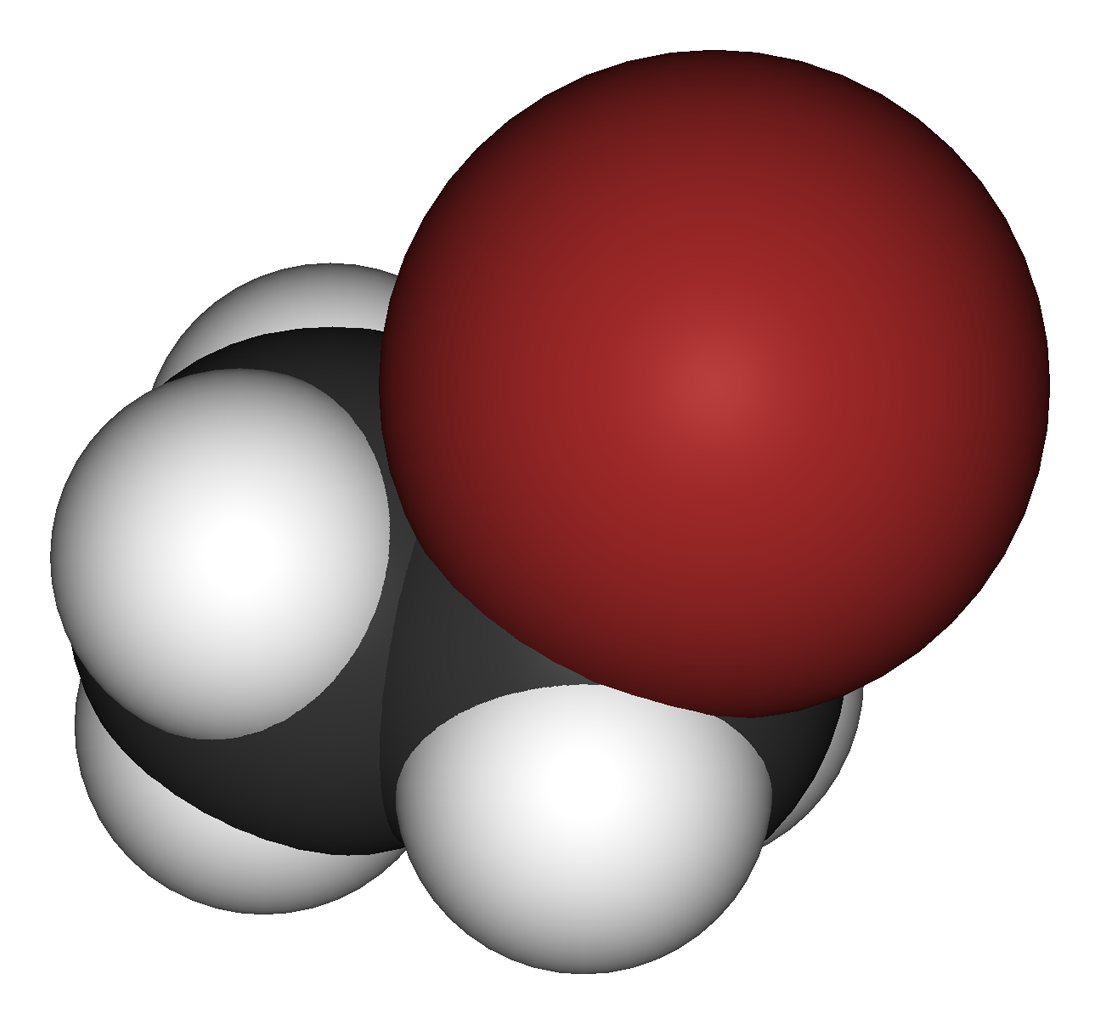
Spacefill model of bromoethane

Names
- Preferred IUPAC name Bromoethane
- Other names Ethyl bromide Monobromoethane

Identifiers
CAS Number	74-96-4
3D model (JSmol)	Interactive image
Abbreviations	EtBr
Beilstein Reference	1209224
ChEBI	CHEBI:47232
ChEMBL	ChEMBL156378
ChemSpider	6092
ECHA InfoCard	100.000.751
EC Number	200-825-8
KEGG	C19354
MeSH	bromoethane
PubChem CID	6332
RTECS number	KH6475000
UNII	LI8384T9PH
UN number	1891
CompTox Dashboard (EPA)	DTXSID6020199
- InChI: InChI=1S/C2H5Br/c1-2-3/h2H2,1H3 Key: RDHPKYGYEGBMSE-UHFFFAOYSA-N
- SMILES: CCBr

Properties
Chemical formula	C_{2}H_{5}Br
Molar mass	108.966 g·mol^{−1}
Appearance	Colorless liquid
Odor	ether-like
Density	1.46 g mL^{−1}
Melting point	−120 to −116 °C; −184 to −177 °F; 153 to 157 K
Boiling point	38.0 to 38.8 °C; 100.3 to 101.8 °F; 311.1 to 311.9 K
Solubility in water	1.067 g/100 mL (0 °C); 0.914 g/100 mL (20 °C); 0.896 g/100 mL (30 °C)
Solubility	miscible with ethanol, ether, chloroform, organic solvents
log P	1.809
Vapor pressure	51.97 kPa (at 20 °C)
Henry's law constant (k_{H})	1.3 μmol Pa^{−1} kg^{−1}
Magnetic susceptibility (χ)	−54.70·10^{−6} cm^{3}/mol
Refractive index (n_{D})	1.4225
Viscosity	402 Pa.s (at 20 °C)

Thermochemistry
Heat capacity (C)	105.8 J K^{−1} mol^{−1}
Std enthalpy of formation (Δ_{f}H^{⦵}_{298})	−97.6–93.4 kJ mol^{−1}

Hazards
- GHS labelling
Pictograms	(GHS07: Exclamation mark) (GHS02: Flammable) (GHS08: Health hazard)
Signal word	Danger
Hazard statements	H225, H302, H332, H351
Precautionary statements	P210, P281
NFPA 704 (fire diamond)	3 1 0
Flash point	−23 °C (−9 °F; 250 K)
Autoignition temperature	511 °C (952 °F; 784 K)
Explosive limits	6.75–11.25%
- Lethal dose or concentration (LD, LC)
LD_{50} (median dose)	1.35 g kg^{−1} (oral, rat)
LC_{50} (median concentration)	26,980 ppm (rat, 1 hr); 16,230 ppm (mouse, 1 hr); 4681 ppm (rat); 2723 ppm (mouse)
LC_{Lo} (lowest published)	3500 ppm (mouse); 24,000 ppm (guinea pig, 30 min); 7000 ppm (guinea pig, >4.5 hr)
- NIOSH (US health exposure limits)
PEL (Permissible)	TWA 200 ppm (890 mg/m^{3})
REL (Recommended)	None established
IDLH (Immediate danger)	2000 ppm

Related compounds
Related alkanes	Bromomethane; Bromoiodomethane; n-Propyl bromide; 2-Bromopropane; tert-Butyl bromide
- Except where otherwise noted, data are given for materials in their standard state (at 25 °C [77 °F], 100 kPa). verify (what is ?) Infobox references

Bromoethane, also known as ethyl bromide, is a chemical compound of the haloalkanes group. It is abbreviated by chemists as EtBr (which is also used as an abbreviation for ethidium bromide). This volatile compound has an ether-like odor.

== Preparation ==
The preparation of EtBr stands as a model for the synthesis of bromoalkanes in general. It is usually prepared by the addition of hydrogen bromide to ethene:

H_{2}C=CH_{2} + HBr → H_{3}C-CH_{2}Br

Bromoethane is inexpensive and would rarely be prepared in the laboratory. A laboratory synthesis includes reacting ethanol with a mixture of hydrobromic and sulfuric acids. An alternate route involves refluxing ethanol with phosphorus and bromine; phosphorus tribromide is generated in situ.

== Uses ==
In organic synthesis, EtBr is the synthetic equivalent of the ethyl carbocation (Et^{+}) synthon. In reality, such a cation is not actually formed. For example, carboxylates salts are converted to ethyl esters, carbanions to ethylated derivatives, thiourea into ethylisothiouronium salts, and amines into ethylamines.

== Safety ==
Short chain monohalocarbons in general are potentially dangerous alkylating agents. Bromides are better alkylating agents than chlorides, thus exposure to them should be minimized.
