= Azirinomycin =

Names
- IUPAC name 3-Methyl-2H-azirine-2-carboxylic acid

Identifiers
CAS Number	31772-89-1
3D model (JSmol)	Interactive image
ChemSpider	33047
PubChem CID	35931
CompTox Dashboard (EPA)	DTXSID10953710
- InChI: InChI=1S/C4H5NO2/c1-2-3(5-2)4(6)7/h3H,1H3,(H,6,7) Key: NHCHAEIJXKFNRU-UHFFFAOYSA-N
- SMILES: CC1=NC1C(=O)O

Properties
Chemical formula	C_{4}H_{5}NO_{2}
Molar mass	99.089 g·mol^{−1}

Related compounds
Related compounds	Azirine; Motualevic acid F
- Except where otherwise noted, data are given for materials in their standard state (at 25 °C [77 °F], 100 kPa). Infobox references

Azirinomycin is an antibiotic azirine derivative with the molecular formula C_{4}H_{5}NO_{2} which is produced by the bacterium Streptomyces aureus. Azirinomycin was first isolated in 1971. Azirinomycin is toxic and therefore it cannot not be used in human medicine.
