= Pimeclone =

Chemical compound

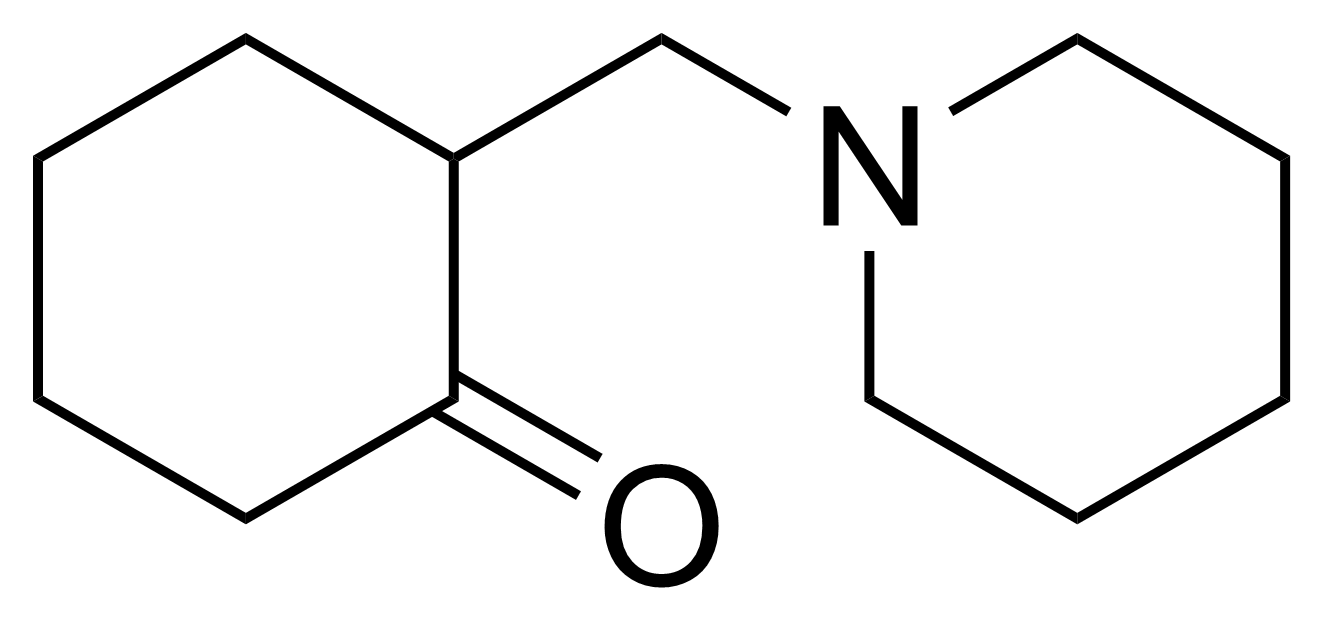

Clinical data
- ATC code: None

Legal status
- Legal status: In general: ℞ (Prescription only)

Identifiers
- IUPAC name: 2-(piperidin-1-ylmethyl)cyclohexanone
- CAS Number: 534-84-9 6966-09-2 (HCl)
- PubChem CID: 197861
- ChemSpider: 171258
- UNII: F0PVL84ZWR
- CompTox Dashboard (EPA): DTXSID5046194

Chemical and physical data
- Formula: C_{12}H_{21}NO
- Molar mass: 195.306 g·mol^{−1}
- 3D model (JSmol): Interactive image
- SMILES: O=C1C(CCCC1)CN2CCCCC2
- InChI: InChI=1S/C12H21NO/c14-12-7-3-2-6-11(12)10-13-8-4-1-5-9-13/h11H,1-10H2; Key:PRFPQYGTPKDLHJ-UHFFFAOYSA-N

Pimeclone (Karion, Spiractin) is a drug described as either a psychostimulant or a respiratory stimulant (conflicting reports) which is sold in Europe. It was first synthesized in 1927.

== See also ==
- 2-Benzylpiperidine
- 4-Benzylpiperidine
- Benzylpiperazine
- Propylhexedrine
