= 3-Bromopentane =

- Skeletal formula of 3-bromopentane

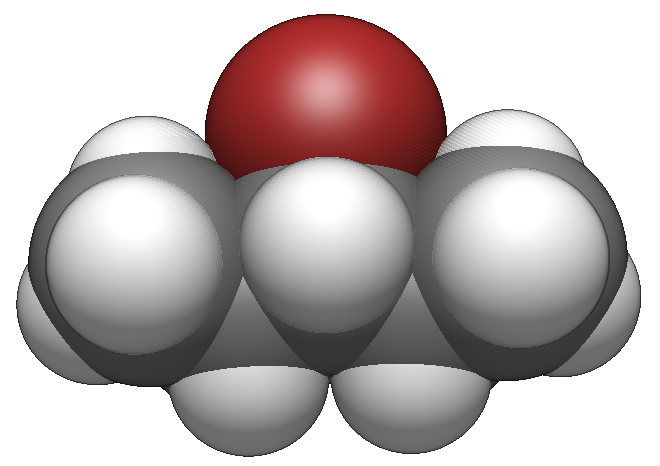
- Van der Waals space filling model of 3-bromopentane

Names
- Preferred IUPAC name 3-Bromopentane
- Other names 3-Pentyl bromide

Identifiers
CAS Number	1809-10-5
3D model (JSmol)	Interactive image
Abbreviations	3-BP
Beilstein Reference	1730967
ChemSpider	14966
ECHA InfoCard	100.015.740
EC Number	217-314-0
PubChem CID	15738
CompTox Dashboard (EPA)	DTXSID2061987
- InChI: InChI=1S/C5H11Br/c1-3-5(6)4-2/h5H,3-4H2,1-2H3 Key: VTOQFOCYBTVOJZ-UHFFFAOYSA-N
- SMILES: CCC(CC)Br

Properties
Chemical formula	C_{5}H_{11}Br
Molar mass	151.047 g·mol^{−1}
Appearance	colorless liquid
Density	1.208 g mL^{−1}
Boiling point	118–119 °C; 244–246 °F; 391–392 K

Hazards
- GHS labelling
Pictograms	(GHS02: Flammable) (GHS07: Exclamation mark)
Hazard statements	H225, H315, H319, H335
Precautionary statements	P210, P233, P240, P241, P242, P243, P261, P264, P264+P265, P271, P280, P302+P352, P303+P361+P353, P304+P340, P305+P351+P338, P319, P321, P332+P317, P337+P317, P362+P364, P370+P378, P403+P233, P403+P235, P405, P501
Flash point	19.0 °C; 66.1 °F; 292.1 K
- Except where otherwise noted, data are given for materials in their standard state (at 25 °C [77 °F], 100 kPa). Infobox references

3-Bromopentane is a bromoalkane and isomer of bromopentane. It is a colorless liquid.
