= Dysidazirine =

Natural chemical compound

Names
- IUPAC name Methyl (2S)-3-[(E)-pentadec-1-enyl]-2H-azirine-2-carboxylate
- Other names (R)-Dysidazirine; (R)-(-)-dysidazirine

Identifiers
| CAS Number | 113507-74-7 |
| 3D model (JSmol) | Interactive image |
| ChEBI | CHEBI:185814 |
| ChEMBL | ChEMBL572129 |
| ChemSpider | 8742081 |
| PubChem CID | 10566693 |
- InChI: InChI=1S/C19H33NO2/c1-3-4-5-6-7-8-9-10-11-12-13-14-15-16-17-18(20-17)19(21)22-2/h15-16,18H,3-14H2,1-2H3/b16-15+/t18-/m0/s1 Key: UOLCWKPNWDZCIP-ZPICJPFVSA-N
- SMILES: CCCCCCCCCCCCCC=CC(=N1)[C@H]1C(=O)OC

Properties
| Chemical formula | C_{19}H_{33}NO_{2} |
| Molar mass | 307.478 g·mol^{−1} |
- Except where otherwise noted, data are given for materials in their standard state (at 25 °C [77 °F], 100 kPa). Infobox references

Dysidazirine is an organic compound with formula C_{19}H_{33}NO_{2}. It was discovered as a natural product in 1988 in the marine sponge Dysidea fragilis. Chemically, it is a 2H-azirine derivative.

Dysidazirine synthesis was reported for the first time in 1995.

Dysidazirine kills the yeasts Candida albicans and Sacharamyces cerevisiae in vitro. It also stops HCT-116 human colon cancer cells from growing.
