= Acetaldoxime =

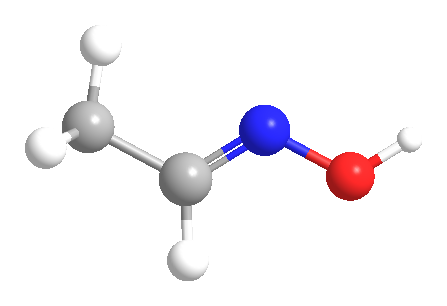

Names
- Preferred IUPAC name N-Hydroxyethanimine
- Other names Aldoxime, Acetaldehyde oxime, Ethanal oxime, Ethylidenehydroxylamine

Identifiers
| CAS Number | 107-29-9 |
| 3D model (JSmol) | Interactive image |
| Beilstein Reference | 1209252 |
| ChEBI | CHEBI:28465 |
| ChemSpider | 4481813 |
| ECHA InfoCard | 100.003.164 |
| EC Number | 203-479-6 |
| PubChem CID | 5324279 |
| RTECS number | AB2975000 |
| UNII | ME6U10SD7D |
| CompTox Dashboard (EPA) | DTXSID2020004 |
- InChI: InChI=1S/C2H5NO/c1-2-3-4/h2,4H,1H3/b3-2+ Key: FZENGILVLUJGJX-NSCUHMNNSA-N; InChI=1/C2H5NO/c1-2-3-4/h2,4H,1H3/b3-2+ Key: FZENGILVLUJGJX-NSCUHMNNBP
- SMILES: N(/O)=C\C

Properties
| Chemical formula | C_{2}H_{5}NO |
| Molar mass | 59.067 g mol^{−1} |
| Appearance | clear, colorless to yellow liquid |
| Density | 0.97 g cm^{−3} |
| Melting point | 25 °C (77 °F; 298 K) (average of the α and β forms) |
| Boiling point | 115.24 °C (239.43 °F; 388.39 K) |
| Solubility in water | 299 g L^{−1} |
| Solubility in ethanol | miscible |
| log P | −0.13 |
| Vapor pressure | 13 mmHg |
| Acidity (pK_{a}) | 11.82 |

Hazards
- Occupational safety and health (OHS/OSH)
| Main hazards | Flammable, harmful by ingestion, irritant |
| NFPA 704 (fire diamond) | 2 2 0 |
| Flash point | 40 °C (104 °F; 313 K) |
| Safety data sheet (SDS) | External MSDS |
- Except where otherwise noted, data are given for materials in their standard state (at 25 °C [77 °F], 100 kPa). Infobox references

Acetaldoxime is the chemical compound with formula C_{2}H_{5}NO. It is one of the simplest oxime-containing compounds, and has a wide variety of uses in chemical synthesis.

== Properties ==
Acetaldoxime will often appear as a colorless liquid, or a white solid. Its solid can form two different needle-like crystal structures. The α-form melts at approximately 44–47 °C, while the β-form melts at 12 °C. The liquid is known to have a pungent odor, and is highly flammable. The compound can act as both an acid or a base, due to its acidic proton on the hydroxyl group and the basic nitrogen atom. The compound exists as a mixture of its Z and E stereoisomers (i.e. syn and anti, or cis and trans) in its normal form. The E stereoisomer can be isolated by slow crystallization of a distilled E/Z mixture.

== Production ==
Acetaldoxime can be prepared by combining pure acetaldehyde and hydroxylamine under heating in the presence of a base.

Preparation of acetaldoxime from acetaldehyde and hydroxylamine

The use of CaO as a base in the preparation of oximes from various types of ketones and aldehydes under mild conditions also gave quantitative yields.

== Reactions ==
=== Alkylation ===
Deprotonation of acetaldoxime with 2 equivalents of n-butyllithium at −78 °C generates the dianion which reacts with benzyl bromide or 1-iodopropane to give excellent yields of α-alkylated (Z)-oximes. α,α-Dialkylation by further alkylation in similar way has been achieved. It is generally known that ketone oximes can be deprotonated and alkylated regiospecifically syn to the oxime hydroxy group. It is essential to perform the deprotonation and alkylation at −78 °C as otherwise no α-alkylated oximes are isolated, the major byproducts being nitriles.

=== Rearrangement to acetamide ===
Heating of acetaldoxime in xylene in the presence of 0.2 mol % nickel(II) acetate or silica gel as catalyst caused isomerization into acetamide.

=== Synthesis of heterocycles ===
Chlorination of acetaldoxime with N-chlorosuccinimide or chlorine gas in chloroform affords acetohydroxamic acid chloride, which suffers dehydrochlorination with triethylamine to give acetonitrile N-oxide. The latter 1,3-dipole undergoes 1,3-dipolar cycloaddition to alkenes giving 2-isoxazolines in a one-pot procedure. This reaction is also suitable for the construction of more complex molecules such as the conversion of a 6-ethylideneolivanic acid derivative into the corresponding spiroisoxazoline.

== Uses ==
Aldoximes such as acetylaldoxime are used during chemical synthesis processes as intermediates for chemical reactions. It is especially notable for its commercial application as an intermediate for the production of pesticides.
