= C3H7Br =

The molecular formula C_{3}H_{7}Br (molar mass: 122.993 g/mol, exact mass: 121.9731 u) may refer to:

- 1-Bromopropane (n-propyl bromide)
- 2-Bromopropane (isopropyl bromide)
