= Self-condensation =

Type of aldol condensation reaction

In organic chemistry, self-condensation is an organic reaction in which a chemical compound containing a carbonyl group (C=O) acts both as the electrophile and the nucleophile in an aldol condensation. It is also called a symmetrical aldol condensation as opposed to a mixed aldol condensation in which the electrophile and nucleophile are different species.

For example, two molecules of acetone condense to a single compound mesityl oxide in the presence of an ion-exchange resin:

2 CH_{3}COCH_{3} → (CH_{3})_{2}C=CH(CO)CH_{3} + H_{2}O

For synthetic uses, this is generally an undesirable, but spontaneous and favored side-reaction of mixed aldol condensation, and special precautions are needed to prevent it.

== Preventing self-condensation ==
In many cases, self-condensation is an unwanted side-reaction. Therefore, chemists have adopted many ways to prevent this from occurring when performing a crossed aldol reaction.

=== The use of a more reactive electrophile, and a non-enolizable partner ===
If acetophenone and benzaldehyde are put together in the presence of aqueous NaOH, only one product is formed:

This occurs because benzaldehyde lacks any enolizable protons, so it cannot form an enolate, and the benzaldehyde is much more electrophilic than any unenolized acetophenone in solution. Therefore, the enolate formed from acetophenone will always preferentially attack the benzaldehyde over another molecule of acetophenone.

=== Making enolate ion quantitatively ===
When nitromethane and acetophenone are combined using aqueous NaOH, only one product is formed:

Here, the acetophenone never gets a chance to condense with itself, because the nitromethane is so much more acidic that the nitro "enolate" is made quantitatively. There is no known published procedure for the condensation between Acetophenone and Nitromethane.

A similar process can also be used to prevent self-condensation between two ketones. In this case, however, the base used needs to be more powerful. A common base used is Lithium diisopropyl amide (LDA). Here it is used in order to perform the crossed condensation between acetone and cyclohexanone.

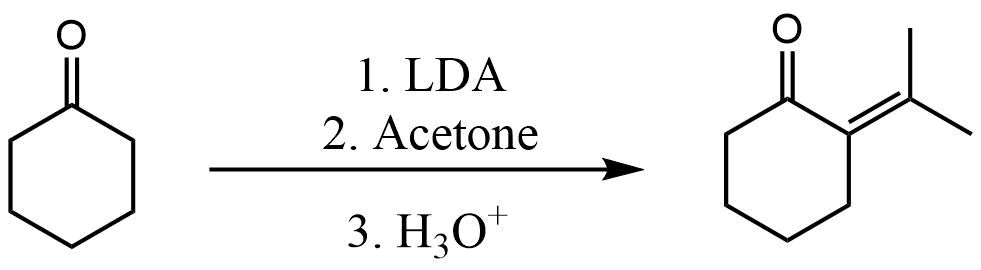

The deprotonation step using LDA is so fast that the enolate formed never gets a chance to react with any unreacted molecules of cyclohexanone. Then the enolate reacts quickly with acetone.

=== Silyl enol ether formation ===
Using LDA will not work when attempting to make enolate ion from aldehydes. They are so reactive that self-condensation will occur. One way to get around this is to turn the aldehyde into a silyl enol ether using trimethylsilyl chloride and a base, such as triethylamine, and then perform the aldol condensation. Here this tactic is employed in the condensation of acetaldehyde and benzaldehyde. A Lewis acid, such as TiCl_{4}, must be used in order to promote condensation.
