= 1-Bromododecane =

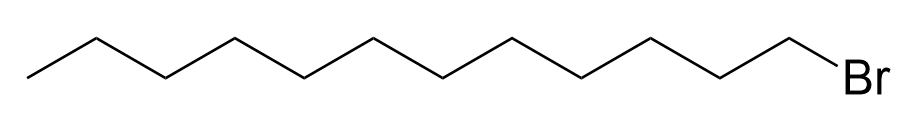
- Skeletal formula of 1-Bromododecane

Names
- Preferred IUPAC name 1-Bromododecane
- Other names Lauryl bromide, dodecyl bromide, n-bromododecane

Identifiers
CAS Number	143-15-7
3D model (JSmol)	Interactive image
ChEMBL	ChEMBL3184907
ChemSpider	8579
ECHA InfoCard	100.005.080
EC Number	205-587-9
PubChem CID	8919
UNII	90T93TX09D
CompTox Dashboard (EPA)	DTXSID2044395
- InChI: InChI=1S/C12H25Br/c1-2-3-4-5-6-7-8-9-10-11-12-13/h2-12H2,1H3 Key: PBLNBZIONSLZBU-UHFFFAOYSA-N
- SMILES: CCCCCCCCCCCCBr

Properties
Chemical formula	C_{12}H_{25}Br
Molar mass	249.236 g·mol^{−1}
Appearance	Colorless liquid
Density	1.038 g mL^{−1}
Melting point	−9.5 °C (14.9 °F; 263.6 K)
Boiling point	276.0 °C (528.8 °F; 549.1 K)

Hazards
- GHS labelling
Pictograms	(GHS07: Exclamation mark)
Signal word	Warning
Hazard statements	H315, H319, H335
Precautionary statements	P261, P264, P271, P280, P302+P352, P304+P340, P305+P351+P338, P312, P321, P332+P313, P337+P313, P362, P403+P233, P405, P501
Flash point	113 °C (235 °F; 386 K)

Related compounds
Related compounds	1-Bromobutane; 1-Bromohexane; Dodecanol; Dodecanal; Dodecanoic acid; Sodium lauryl sulfate
- Except where otherwise noted, data are given for materials in their standard state (at 25 °C [77 °F], 100 kPa). Infobox references

1-Bromododecane is a bromoalkane with the formula Br(CH_{2})_{11}CH_{3}. It is a colorless liquid. It is used as a long chain alkylating agent to improve the lipophilicity and hydrophobicity of organic molecules for biological applications.

== Production ==
Most 1-bromoalkanes are prepared by free-radical addition of hydrogen bromide to the 1-alkene, which is 1-dodecene in the case of 1-bromododecane. These conditions lead to anti-Markovnikov addition, giving the 1-bromo derivative.

1-Bromododecane can also be prepared by treating dodecanol with hydrobromic acid and sulfuric acid.

CH_{3}(CH_{2})_{11}OH + HBr → CH_{3}(CH_{2})_{11}Br + H_{2}O
