= C4H9Br =

The molecular formula C_{4}H_{9}Br, (molar mass: 137.02 g/mol, exact mass: 135.9888 u) may refer to:

- 1-Bromobutane
- 2-Bromobutane
- tert-Butyl bromide
- 1-Bromo-2-methylpropane
