= C4H9F =

The molecular formula C_{4}H_{9}F may refer to:

- 1-Fluorobutane (n-Butyl fluoride)
- 2-Fluorobutane (sec-Butyl fluoride)
- Isobutyl fluoride (1-fluoro-2-methylpropane)
- tert-Butyl fluoride (2-fluoro-2-methylpropane)
