= C4H9I =

The molecular formula C_{4}H_{9}I, (molar mass: 184.020 g/mol, exact mass: 183.97490 u) may refer to:

- 1-Iodobutane
- 2-Iodobutane
- tert-Butyl iodide
- iso-Butyl iodide
