= C6H13Br =

The molecular formula C_{6}H_{13}Br (molar mass: 165.07 g/mol, exact mass: 164.0201 u) may refer to:

- 1-Bromohexane
- 2-Bromohexane
