= Cobalt laurate =

Names
- Other names Cobalt dodecanoate

Identifiers
CAS Number	14960-16-8 incorrect SMILES
3D model (JSmol)	Interactive image
ChemSpider	62871462
PubChem CID	12889962
- InChI: InChI=1S/2C12H24O2.Co/c2*1-2-3-4-5-6-7-8-9-10-11-12(13)14;/h2*2-11H2,1H3,(H,13,14); Key: OCDFTWVGTADYMH-UHFFFAOYSA-N
- SMILES: CCCCCCCCCCCC(=O)O.CCCCCCCCCCCC(=O)O.[Co]

Properties
Chemical formula	C_{24}H_{48}CoO_{4}
Molar mass	459.577 g·mol^{−1}
Appearance	dark violet solid
Solubility in water	insoluble
Solubility	soluble in alcohol
- Except where otherwise noted, data are given for materials in their standard state (at 25 °C [77 °F], 100 kPa). Infobox references

Cobalt laurate is a metal-organic compound with the chemical formula C_{24}H_{48}CoO_{4}. It forms a dark violet solid, classified as a metallic soap, i.e. a metal derivative of a fatty acid (lauric acid).

== Synthesis ==
Cobalt laurate can be prepared by the reaction of aqueous solutions of cobalt(II) chloride (CoCl_{2}) with sodium laurate.

== Properties ==
Cobalt laurate is noted to be sparingly soluble in aqueous and non-aqueous solvents; however, it is particularly quite soluble in methanol.

When cobalt laurate was prepared using the radioactive isotope ^{58}Co, its activity was measured to be 1.2 ± 0.2 millicurie/g.
