= Dodecanol =

- Skeletal formula

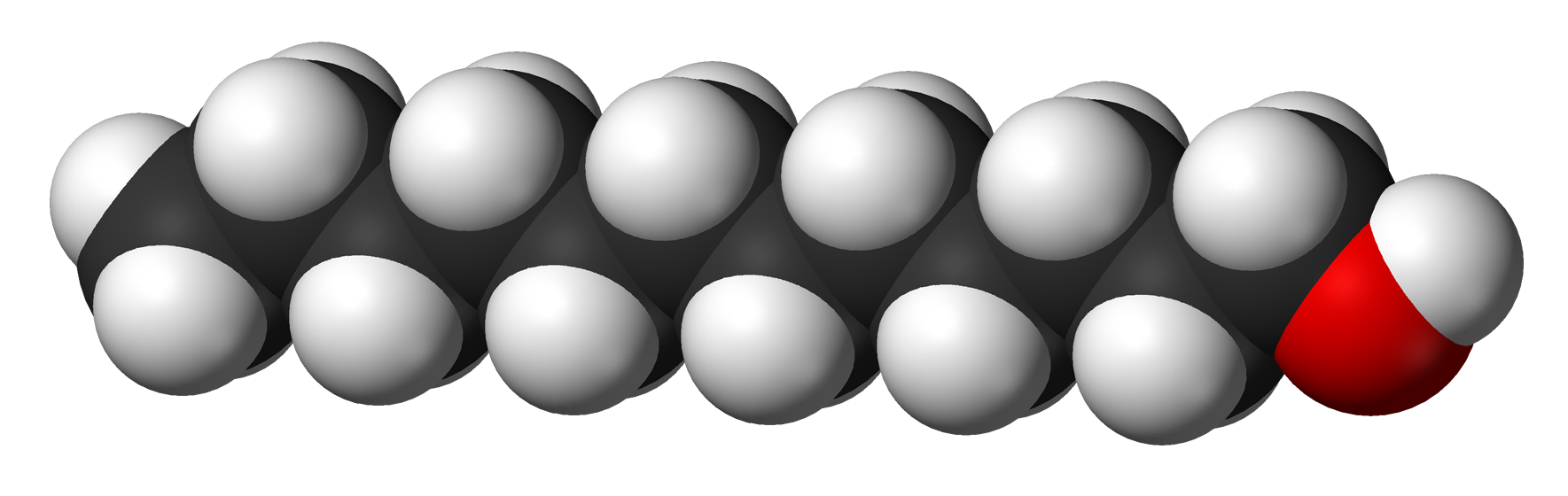
- Space-filling model

Names
- Preferred IUPAC name Dodecan-1-ol
- Other names Dodecanol; 1-Dodecanol; Dodecyl alcohol Lauryl alcohol

Identifiers
| CAS Number | 112-53-8 |
| 3D model (JSmol) | Interactive image |
| Abbreviations | DoOH n-DoOH nDoOH^{n}DoOH |
| ChEBI | CHEBI:28878 |
| ChEMBL | ChEMBL24722 |
| ChemSpider | 7901 |
| DrugBank | DB06894 |
| ECHA InfoCard | 100.003.620 |
| KEGG | C02277 |
| PubChem CID | 8193 |
| UNII | 178A96NLP2 |
| CompTox Dashboard (EPA) | DTXSID5026918 |
- InChI: InChI=1S/C12H26O/c1-2-3-4-5-6-7-8-9-10-11-12-13/h13H,2-12H2,1H3 Key: LQZZUXJYWNFBMV-UHFFFAOYSA-N; InChI=1/C12H26O/c1-2-3-4-5-6-7-8-9-10-11-12-13/h13H,2-12H2,1H3 Key: LQZZUXJYWNFBMV-UHFFFAOYAU
- SMILES: OCCCCCCCCCCCC

Properties
| Chemical formula | C_{12}H_{26}O |
| Molar mass | 186.339 g·mol^{−1} |
| Appearance | Colorless solid |
| Density | 0.8309 g/cm^{3} |
| Melting point | 24 °C (75 °F; 297 K) |
| Boiling point | 259 °C (498 °F; 532 K) |
| Solubility in water | 0.004 g/L |
| Solubility in ethanol and diethyl ether | Soluble |
| Magnetic susceptibility (χ) | −147.70×10^{−6} cm^{3}/mol |

Hazards
- GHS labelling
| Pictograms | (GHS07: Exclamation mark) (GHS09: Environmental hazard) |
| Signal word | Warning |
| Hazard statements | H319, H410, H411 |
| Precautionary statements | P264+P265, P273, P280, P305+P351+P338, P337+P317, P391, P501 |
| Flash point | 127 °C (261 °F; 400 K) |

Related compounds
| Related | Dodecanal; Dodecanoic acid; 1-Bromododecane |
- Except where otherwise noted, data are given for materials in their standard state (at 25 °C [77 °F], 100 kPa). verify (what is ?) Infobox references

Dodecanol /ˈdoʊˈdɛkɑːnɒl/, or lauryl alcohol, is an organic compound produced industrially from palm kernel oil or coconut oil. It is a fatty alcohol. Sulfate esters of lauryl alcohol, especially sodium lauryl sulfate, are very widely used as surfactants. Sodium lauryl sulfate and the related dodecanol derivatives ammonium lauryl sulfate and sodium laureth sulfate are all used in shampoos. Dodecanol is tasteless, colorless, and has a floral odor.

== Production and use ==
In 1993, the European demand of dodecanol was around 60,000 tonnes per year. It can be obtained from palm kernel oil or coconut oil fatty acids and methyl esters by hydrogenation. It may also be produced synthetically via the Ziegler process. A classic laboratory method involves Bouveault-Blanc reduction of ethyl laurate.

Dodecanol is used to make surfactants, which are used in lubricating oils, and pharmaceuticals. Millions of tons of sodium dodecylsulfate (SDS) are produced annually by sulfation of dodecyl alcohol:

SO_{3} + CH_{3}(CH_{2})_{10}CH_{2}OH → CH_{3}(CH_{2})_{10}CH_{2}OSO_{3}H
CH_{3}(CH_{2})_{10}CH_{2}OSO_{3}H + NaOH→CH_{3}(CH_{2})_{10}CH_{2}OSO_{3}Na + H_{2}O

Dodecanol is used as an emollient. It is also the precursor to dodecanal, an important fragrance, and 1-bromododecane, an alkylating agent for improving the lipophilicity of organic molecules.

== Toxicity ==
Dodecanol can irritate the skin. It has about half the toxicity of ethanol, but it is very harmful to marine organisms.

== Mutual solubility with water ==
The mutual solubility of 1-dodecanol and water has been quantified as follows.

Mutual solubility of water and 1-dodecanol (98%, melting point 24 °C), Weight %
| Temperature (°C) | Solubility of dodecanol in water | Solubility of water in dodecanol |
|---|---|---|
| 29.5 | 0.04 | 2.87 |
| 40.0 | 0.05 | 2.85 |
| 50.2 | 0.09 | 2.69 |
| 60.5 | 0.15 | 2.96 |
| 70.5 | 0.09 | 2.70 |
| 80.3 | 0.14 | 2.89 |
| 90.8 | 0.18 | 2.96 |
| standard deviation | 0.02 | 0.01 |
