= 2-Iodobutane =

Structural formula of (R)-2-Iodobutane
Structural formula of (S)-2-Iodobutane

Names
- Preferred IUPAC name 2-Iodobutane
- Other names sec-Iodobutane s-Iodobutane sec-Butyl iodide s-Butyl iodide sec-Butyliodide s-Butyliodide; 2-Butyl iodide 2-Butyliodide

Identifiers
CAS Number	513-48-4; (R): 22156-92-9; (S): 29882-56-2
3D model (JSmol)	Interactive image; (R): Interactive image; (S): Interactive image
Abbreviations	2-IB s-IB; SIB s-BuI sBuI^{s}BuI
ChemSpider	10119; (S): 21427360
ECHA InfoCard	100.007.422
EC Number	208-163-1 (S): 984-019-8
UNII	4302E40S4N; (R): F9SLD70W1I; (S): 070Q64A4RC
UN number	2390
CompTox Dashboard (EPA)	DTXSID40858729
- InChI: InChI=1S/C4H9I/c1-3-4(2)5/h4H,3H2,1-2H3 Key: IQRUSQUYPCHEKN-UHFFFAOYSA-N; (R): InChI=1S/C4H9I/c1-3-4(2)5/h4H,3H2,1-2H3/t4-/m1/s1 Key: IQRUSQUYPCHEKN-SCSAIBSYSA-N; (S): InChI=1S/C4H9I/c1-3-4(2)5/h4H,3H2,1-2H3/t4-/m0/s1 Key: IQRUSQUYPCHEKN-BYPYZUCNSA-N
- SMILES: CCC(C)I; (R): CC[C@@H](C)I; (S): CC[C@H](C)I

Properties
Chemical formula	C_{4}H_{9}I
Molar mass	184.020 g·mol^{−1}
Appearance	Colorless liquid
Odor	Ether-like
Density	1.598 g/mL at 25 °C
Melting point	−104 °C (−155 °F; 169 K)
Boiling point	119–120 °C (246–248 °F; 392–393 K)
Vapor pressure	17.1 mmHg
Refractive index (n_{D})	1.499 at 20 °C

Hazards
- GHS labelling
Pictograms	(GHS02: Flammable) (GHS07: Exclamation mark)
Signal word	Danger
Hazard statements	H225, H226, H315, H319, H335
Precautionary statements	P210, P233, P240, P241, P242, P243, P261, P264, P264+P265, P271, P280, P302+P352, P303+P361+P353, P304+P340, P305+P351+P338, P319, P321, P332+P317, P337+P317, P362+P364, P370+P378, P403+P233, P403+P235, P405, P501
- Except where otherwise noted, data are given for materials in their standard state (at 25 °C [77 °F], 100 kPa). Infobox references

2-Iodobutane is an organoiodine compound with the formula C_{4}H_{9}I or CH_{3}(CH_{2})_{3}I. At standard conditions it is a colorless liquid.

== See also ==
- Iodobutane
  - 1-Iodobutane
  - tert-Butyl iodide
