= Silver laurate =

Names
- Other names Silver dodecanoate

Identifiers
| CAS Number | 18268-45-6 |
| 3D model (JSmol) | Interactive image |
| ChemSpider | 8080298 |
| PubChem CID | 9904644 |
| UNII | DWM4CQP22U |
- InChI: InChI=1S/C12H24O2.Ag/c1-2-3-4-5-6-7-8-9-10-11-12(13)14;/h2-11H2,1H3,(H,13,14);/q;+1/p-1 Key: MNMYRUHURLPFQW-UHFFFAOYSA-M
- SMILES: CCCCCCCCCCCC(=O)[O-].[Ag+]

Properties
| Chemical formula | C_{11}H_{23}AgO_{2} |
| Molar mass | 295.171 g·mol^{−1} |
| Appearance | Colorless (white) crystals |
| Density | 1.5 g/cm^{3} |
| Melting point | 215.5 °C (419.9 °F; 488.6 K) |
| Solubility in water | Insoluble |
| Solubility | Insoluble in ethanol, diethyl ether. |

Structure
| Crystal structure | triclinic |
| Space group | P1̅ (No. 2) |
| Lattice constant | a = 4.079, b = 4.628, c = 34.08 α = 85.45°, β = 89.41°, γ = 78.55° |
| Formula units (Z) | 2 units per cell |
- Except where otherwise noted, data are given for materials in their standard state (at 25 °C [77 °F], 100 kPa). Infobox references

Silver laurate is an inorganic compound, a salt of silver and lauric acid with the formula AgC_{11}H_{23}COO. It forms colorless (white), triclinic crystals.

== Preparation ==
Silver laurate can be prepared by treating a pH-adjusted silver nitrate solution with a methanolic solution of lauric acid. The silver nitrate solution's pH is set to 9 by the addition of ammonia solution.
