= Ammonium lauryl sulfate =

- Structure of ammonium lauryl sulfate

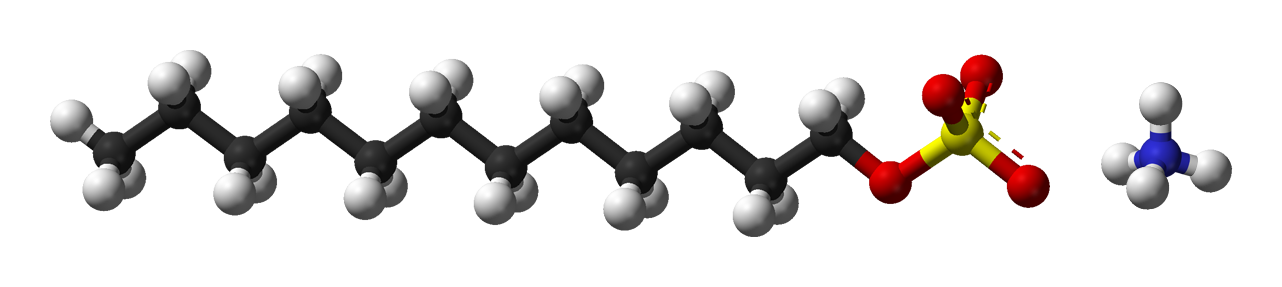
- Ball-and-stick model of ammonium lauryl sulfate

Names
- IUPAC name Ammonium dodecyl sulfate
- Other names • monododecyl ester, ammonium salt • Ammonium dodecyl sulfate

Identifiers
CAS Number	2235-54-3
3D model (JSmol)	Interactive image
Abbreviations	ALS
ChemSpider	15835
ECHA InfoCard	100.017.086
PubChem CID	16700
UNII	Q7AO2R1M0B
CompTox Dashboard (EPA)	DTXSID2027462
- InChI: InChI=1S/C12H26O4S.H3N/c1-2-3-4-5-6-7-8-9-10-11-12-16-17(13,14)15;/h2-12H2,1H3,(H,13,14,15);1H3 Key: BTBJBAZGXNKLQC-UHFFFAOYSA-N; InChI=1/C12H26O4S.H3N/c1-2-3-4-5-6-7-8-9-10-11-12-16-17(13,14)15;/h2-12H2,1H3,(H,13,14,15);1H3 Key: BTBJBAZGXNKLQC-UHFFFAOYAS
- SMILES: [O-]S(=O)(=O)OCCCCCCCCCCCC.[NH4+]

Properties
Chemical formula	C_{12}H_{20}NO_{4}S
Molar mass	274.36 g·mol^{−1}
Appearance	yellowish viscous liquid
Density	1.02 g/cm^{3}
Boiling point	418 °C (784 °F; 691 K)
- Except where otherwise noted, data are given for materials in their standard state (at 25 °C [77 °F], 100 kPa). verify (what is ?) Infobox references

Ammonium lauryl sulfate (ALS) is the INCI name and common name for ammonium dodecyl sulfate (CH_{3}(CH_{2})_{10}CH_{2}OSO_{3}NH_{4}). The anion consists of a nonpolar hydrocarbon chain and a polar sulfate end group. The combination of nonpolar and polar groups confers surfactant properties to the anion: it facilitates dissolution of both polar and non-polar materials. This salt is classified as a sulfate ester. It is made from coconut or palm kernel oil for use primarily in shampoos and body-wash as a foaming agent. Lauryl sulfates are very high-foam surfactants that disrupt the surface tension of water in part by forming micelles at the surface-air interface.

== Action in solution ==
Above the critical micelle concentration, the anions organize into a micelle, in which they form a sphere with the polar, hydrophilic heads of the sulfate portion on the outside (surface) of the sphere and the nonpolar, hydrophobic tails pointing inwards towards the center. The water molecules around the micelle in turn arrange themselves around the polar heads, which disrupts their ability to hydrogen bond with other nearby water molecules. Up to the critical micelle concentration, increasing amount of dissolved surfactant reduces the surface tension of the solution, which affords a greater ability to penetrate or "wet out" various surfaces, including porous structures like cloth, fibers, and hair. Accordingly, this structured solution allows the solution to more readily dissolve soils, greases, etc. in and on such substrates. Lauryl sulfates however exhibit poor soil suspending capacity.

== Safety ==
ALS is an innocuous detergent. A 1983 report by the Cosmetic Ingredient Review, shampoos containing up to 31% ALS registered 6 health complaints out of 6.8 million units sold. These complaints included two of scalp itch, two allergic reactions, one hair damage and one complaint of eye irritation.

The CIR report concluded that both sodium and ammonium lauryl sulfate "appear to be safe in formulations designed for discontinuous, brief use followed by thorough rinsing from the surface of the skin. In products intended for prolonged use, concentrations should not exceed 1%".

The Human and Environmental Risk Assessment (HERA) project performed a thorough investigation of all alkyl sulfates, as such the results they found apply directly to ALS. Most alkyl sulfates exhibit low acute oral toxicity, no toxicity through exposure to the skin, concentration dependent skin irritation, and concentration dependent eye-irritation. They do not sensitize the skin and did not appear to be carcinogenic in a two-year study on rats. The report found that longer carbon chains (16–18) were less irritating to the skin than chains of 12–15 carbons in length. In addition, concentrations below 1% were essentially non-irritating while concentrations greater than 10% produced moderate to strong irritation of the skin.

== Occupational exposure ==
The CDC has reported on occupations which were routinely exposed to ALS between 1981 and 1983. During this time, the occupation with the highest number of workers exposed was registered nurses, followed closely by funeral directors.

== Environment ==
The HERA project also conducted an environmental review of alkyl sulfates that found all alkyl sulfates are readily biodegradable and standard wastewater treatment operations removed 96–99.96% of short-chain (12–14 carbons) alkyl sulfates. Even in anaerobic conditions at least 80% of the original volume is biodegraded after 15 days with 90% degradation after 4 weeks.

== See also ==
- Sodium lauryl sulfate
- Sodium laureth sulfate
- Potassium lauryl sulfate
- Sodium pareth sulfate
