= 1-Fluorohexane =

- Structural formula

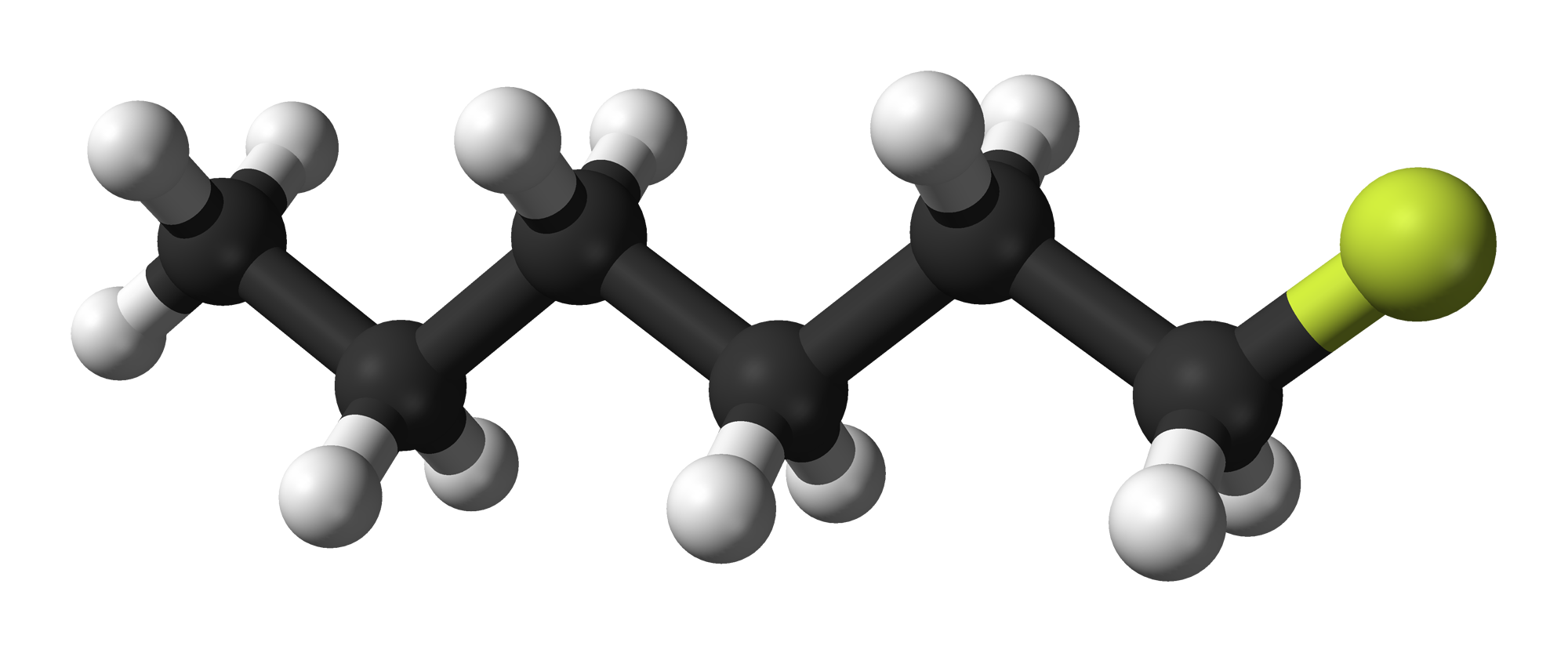
- Ball and stick model

Names
- Preferred IUPAC name 1-Fluorohexane
- Other names 1-Hexyl fluoride

Identifiers
CAS Number	373-14-8
3D model (JSmol)	Interactive image
Abbreviations	HxF n-HxF nHxF^{n}HxF
ChemSpider	9377
ECHA InfoCard	100.006.149
EC Number	206-763-8
PubChem CID	9760
CompTox Dashboard (EPA)	DTXCID0039308
- InChI: InChI=1S/C6H13F/c1-2-3-4-5-6-7/h2-6H2,1H3 Key: OFERIJCSHDJMSA-UHFFFAOYSA-N
- SMILES: CCCCCCF

Properties
Chemical formula	C_{6}H_{13}F
Molar mass	104.168 g·mol^{−1}
Appearance	Liquid
Density	0.8 g/cm^{3}
Melting point	−103 °C (−153 °F; 170 K)
Boiling point	92–93 °C (198–199 °F; 365–366 K)

Hazards
- GHS labelling
Pictograms	(GHS02: Flammable) (GHS06: Toxic)
Signal word	Danger
- Except where otherwise noted, data are given for materials in their standard state (at 25 °C [77 °F], 100 kPa). Infobox references

1-Fluorohexane is a chemical compound from the group of aliphatic saturated halogenated hydrocarbons. The chemical formula is CH_{3}(CH_{2})_{5}F.

== Synthesis ==
1-Fluorohexane can be obtained by reacting 1-chlorohexane or 1-bromohexane with potassium fluoride in ethylene glycol.

== Physical properties ==
1-Fluorohexane is a colorless liquid that is soluble in ether and benzene.

== Chemical properties ==
The compound reacts with activated Mg:

CH_{3}(CH_{2})_{5}F + Mg (activated) → C_{6}H_{13}MgF

== Uses ==
The compound is primarily used in the field of organic chemistry as a reagent or solvent. Also, 1-fluorohexane is used in physical chemistry as a model compound for understanding the physico-chemical properties of fluorinated hydrocarbons.

== See also ==
- 1-Bromohexane
- 1-Chlorohexane
- 1-Iodohexane
- Perfluorohexane
