= 2-Phenylhexane =

Names
- Preferred IUPAC name (Hexan-2-yl)benzene
- Other names 2-Phenylhexane

Identifiers
CAS Number	6031-02-3
3D model (JSmol)	Interactive image; Interactive image
ChemSpider	21010
PubChem CID	22385
UNII	8I5F5V031E
CompTox Dashboard (EPA)	DTXSID9041447
- InChI: InChI=1S/C12H18/c1-3-4-8-11(2)12-9-6-5-7-10-12/h5-7,9-11H,3-4,8H2,1-2H3 Key: CYBSWFUWEZFKNJ-UHFFFAOYSA-N; InChI=1/C12H18/c1-3-4-8-11(2)12-9-6-5-7-10-12/h5-7,9-11H,3-4,8H2,1-2H3 Key: CYBSWFUWEZFKNJ-UHFFFAOYAV
- SMILES: CCCCC(C)C1=CC=CC=C1; c1ccccc1C(CCCC)C

Properties
Chemical formula	C_{12}H_{18}
Molar mass	162.276 g·mol^{−1}
Density	0.858 g/ml
- Except where otherwise noted, data are given for materials in their standard state (at 25 °C [77 °F], 100 kPa). verify (what is ?) Infobox references

2-Phenylhexane is an aromatic hydrocarbon. It can be produced by a Friedel-Crafts alkylation between 1-chlorohexane and benzene., or by the reaction of benzene and 1-hexene with various acid catalysts such as antimony pentafluoride, scandium(III) triflate, and phosphoric acid.
