= Cohune oil =

Names
- IUPAC name Cohune oil
- Other names Cohune nut oil Cohune palm oil Attalea cohune seed oil

Identifiers
ChemSpider	none
UNII	3JB1E4715T

Properties
Density	1000 kg/m^{3}, liquid (4 °C) (62.4 lb/cu. ft); 917 kg/m^{3}, solid
Melting point	28 °C
- Except where otherwise noted, data are given for materials in their standard state (at 25 °C [77 °F], 100 kPa). Infobox references

Cohune oil is pressed from the seeds of the cohune palm, which is native to Central and South America.

Along with other byproducts of the palm, cohune oil is believed to have been used by cultures in southern Mesoamerica since the pre-Columbian era, in particular by the Maya. Uses of the oil include as a lubricant, for cooking, soapmaking and lamp oil. For this latter purpose the oil was placed in earthenware or soapstone lamps and lit with a wick, for cooking and illumination.

Cohune oil is made up of the following portions of fatty acids:

Fatty acid	Percentage
Caprylic	7.5%
Capric	6.5%
Lauric	46.5%
Myristic	16.0%
Palmitic	9.5%
Stearic	3.0%
Oleic	10.0%
Linoleic	1.0%

== Commercialization ==
Cohune oil is generally not used commercially because the cohune palm is very difficult to break open. However, the manufacture and usage of the oil continues among certain contemporary Maya communities in Belize, Guatemala and Honduras.
