= Di-tert-butylcyclopentadiene =

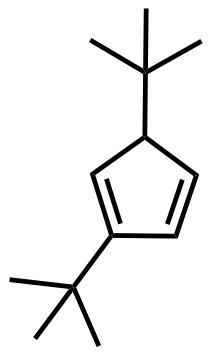

Identifiers
CAS Number	73046-16-9; 114987-03-0
3D model (JSmol)	Interactive image
Abbreviations	(Me_{3}C)_{2}C_{5}H_{4}
ChemSpider	2835281
PubChem CID	3599405
CompTox Dashboard (EPA)	DTXSID70394029
- InChI: InChI=1S/C13H22/c1-12(2,3)10-7-8-11(9-10)13(4,5)6/h7-10H,1-6H3 Key: RADVPPBTEASJRZ-UHFFFAOYSA-N
- SMILES: CC(C)(C)C1C=CC(=C1)C(C)(C)C

Properties
Chemical formula	C_{13}H_{22}
Molar mass	178.319 g·mol^{−1}
Boiling point	100–105 °C (212–221 °F; 373–378 K) 30 torr
- Except where otherwise noted, data are given for materials in their standard state (at 25 °C [77 °F], 100 kPa). Infobox references

Di-tert-butylcyclopentadiene is an organic compound with the formula (Me_{3}C)_{2}C_{5}H_{4}, where Me = methyl. It is a colorless liquid that is soluble in organic solvents. The compound is the conjugate acid of the di-tert-butylcyclopentadienyl ligand, (Me_{3}C)_{2}C_{5}H_{3}^{−} (sometimes abbreviated Cp^{‡−}). Two regioisomers of di-tert-butylcyclopentadiene exist, depending on the relative location of the double bonds.

== Synthesis and reactions ==
Di-tert-butylcyclopentadiene is prepared by alkylation of cyclopentadiene with tert-butyl bromide under phase-transfer conditions.

It is the precursor to many metal complexes, such as the olefin polymerization catalyst ((Me_{3}C)_{2}C_{5}H_{3})TiCl_{3}.

The conjugate base of di-tert-butylcyclopentadiene reacts with a third equivalent of tert-butyl bromide to give (Me_{3}C)_{3}C_{5}H_{3}:

(Me_{3}C)_{2}C_{5}H_{4} + NaH → Na(Me_{3}C)_{3}C_{5}H_{3} + H_{2}
Na(Me_{3}C)_{2}C_{5}H_{3} + Me_{3}CBr → (Me_{3}C)_{3}C_{5}H_{3} + NaBr
