= 1-Iodohexane =

Names
- Preferred IUPAC name 1-Iodohexane
- Other names 1-Hexyl iodide

Identifiers
CAS Number	638-45-9
3D model (JSmol)	Interactive image
ChEMBL	ChEMBL3188734
ChemSpider	12010
ECHA InfoCard	100.010.309
EC Number	211-339-0
PubChem CID	12527
UNII	27F4BFU2DR
CompTox Dashboard (EPA)	DTXSID2049341
- InChI: InChI=1S/C6H13I/c1-2-3-4-5-6-7/h2-6H2,1H3 Key: ANOOTOPTCJRUPK-UHFFFAOYSA-N
- SMILES: CCCCCCI

Properties
Chemical formula	C_{6}H_{13}I
Molar mass	212.074 g·mol^{−1}
Appearance	yellowish liquid
Density	1.437 g/cm^{3}
Melting point	−75 °C (−103 °F; 198 K)
Boiling point	181 °C (358 °F; 454 K)
Solubility in water	practically insoluble

Related compounds
Related compounds	1-Bromohexane; 1-Chlorohexane; 1-Fluorohexane

Hazards
- Occupational safety and health (OHS/OSH)
- Main hazards
- GHS labelling
Pictograms	(GHS05: Corrosive) (GHS07: Exclamation mark)
Signal word	Danger
Hazard statements	H302, H315, H318, H319, H335
Precautionary statements	P261, P264, P264+P265, P270, P271, P280, P301+P317, P302+P352, P304+P340, P305+P351+P338, P305+P354+P338, P317, P319, P321, P330, P332+P317, P337+P317, P362+P364, P403+P233, P405, P501
- Except where otherwise noted, data are given for materials in their standard state (at 25 °C [77 °F], 100 kPa). Infobox references

1-Iodohexane is a chemical compound from the group of aliphatic saturated halogenated hydrocarbons. The chemical formula is CH_{3}(CH_{2})_{5}I. It is a colorless liquid.

== Synthesis ==
1-Iodohexane can be obtained by treating 1-bromohexane with potassium iodide.

The compound can also be prepared by treating 1-hexanol with iodine and triphenylphosphine.

== Physical properties ==
1-Iodohexane is a flammable, difficult to ignite, light-sensitive liquid that is practically insoluble in water. Copper is usually added to the compound as a stabilizer.

== Uses ==
The compound is used as an alkylating agent in organic synthesis. Also, it is used as an intermediate in the production of other chemical compounds such as tetradecane.

== See also ==
- 1-Bromohexane
- 1-Chlorohexane
- 1-Fluorohexane
