= 1-Chlorohexane =

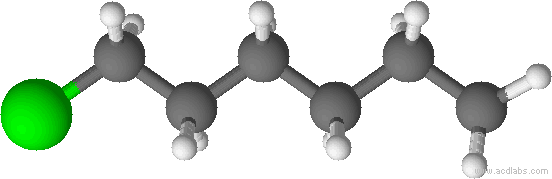

Names
- Preferred IUPAC name 1-Chlorohexane
- Other names 1-Hexyl chloride

Identifiers
CAS Number	544-10-5
3D model (JSmol)	Interactive image
Abbreviations	HxCl n=HxCl nHxCl^{n}HxCl
ChEMBL	ChEMBL156095
ChemSpider	10526
ECHA InfoCard	100.008.054
EC Number	208-859-5
PubChem CID	10992
UNII	R5L7I6O9NW
UN number	1993
CompTox Dashboard (EPA)	DTXSID1060265
- InChI: InChI=1S/C6H13Cl/c1-2-3-4-5-6-7/h2-6H2,1H3 Key: MLRVZFYXUZQSRU-UHFFFAOYSA-N
- SMILES: CCCCCCCl

Properties
Chemical formula	C_{6}H_{13}Cl
Molar mass	120.62 g·mol^{−1}
Appearance	Liquid
Density	0.88 g/cm^{3}
Melting point	−94.0 °C (−137.2 °F; 179.2 K)
Boiling point	135 °C (275 °F; 408 K)
Solubility in water	sparingly soluble

Hazards
- GHS labelling
Pictograms	(GHS02: Flammable)
Signal word	Warning
Hazard statements	H226, H412
Precautionary statements	P210, P233, P240, P241, P242, P243, P273, P280, P303+P361+P353, P370+P378, P403+P235, P501
- Except where otherwise noted, data are given for materials in their standard state (at 25 °C [77 °F], 100 kPa). Infobox references

1-Chlorohexane is a chemical compound from the group of aliphatic saturated halogenated hydrocarbons. The chemical formula is CH_{3}(CH_{2})_{5}Cl.

== Synthesis ==
1-Chlorohexane can be obtained by reacting hexyl alcohol with hydrochloric acid or thionyl chloride.

== Physical properties ==
1-Chlorohexane is a colorless liquid with an aromatic odor that is very sparingly soluble in water.

== Chemical properties ==
1-Fluorohexane can be prepared by reacting 1-chlorohexane with potassium fluoride in ethylene glycol.

2-Phenylhexane can be prepared by reacting the compound with benzene and aluminum trichloride.

== See also ==
- 1-Fluorohexane
- 1-Bromohexane
- 1-Iodohexane
