= Sodium laureth sulfate =

Surfactant/detergent

Names
- IUPAC name α-Sulfo-ω-(dodecyloxy)-poly(oxyethane-1,2-diyl), sodium salt
- Other names Sodium lauryl ether sulfate Sodium laureth sulphate Sodium dodecyl polyoxyethylene sulfate Sodium lauryl polyoxyethylene sulfate Sodium lauryl polyoxyethylene ether sulfate Sodium lauryl dioxyethylene sulfate Sodium lauryl trioxyethylene sulfate Sodium laureth-2 sulfate Sodium laureth-3 sulfate

Identifiers
CAS Number	sodium laureth-2 sulfate: 3088-31-1; sodium laureth-3 sulfate: 13150-00-0; sodium laureth-5 sulfate: 9004-82-4
Abbreviations	SLES
ChemSpider	sodium laureth-2 sulfate: none
ECHA InfoCard	100.036.281
PubChem CID	23665884 (sodium 2-dodecoxyethyl sulfate)
UNII	sodium laureth-2 sulfate: ZZQ59TY3KG; sodium laureth-3 sulfate: BPV390UAP0; sodium laureth-5 sulfate: 410Q7WN1BX
CompTox Dashboard (EPA)	sodium laureth-2 sulfate: DTXSID2029298 DTXSID70274019, DTXSID2029298

Properties
Chemical formula	CH_{3}(CH_{2})_{11}(OCH_{2}CH_{2})_{n}OSO_{3}Na
Molar mass	Variable; typically around 421 g/mol (288.38 + 44.05n) g/mol

Hazards
NFPA 704 (fire diamond)	2 1 0
- Except where otherwise noted, data are given for materials in their standard state (at 25 °C [77 °F], 100 kPa). verify (what is ?) Infobox references

Sodium lauryl ether sulfate (SLES), usually contracted as sodium laureth sulfate, and also called sodium alkylethersulfate, is an anionic detergent and surfactant found in many personal care products (soaps, shampoos, toothpaste, etc.) and for industrial uses. SLES is an inexpensive and very effective foaming agent.

SLES, sodium lauryl sulfate (SLS), ammonium lauryl sulfate (ALS), and sodium pareth sulfate are surfactants that are used in many cosmetic products for their cleaning and emulsifying properties. It is derived from palm kernel oil or coconut oil. In herbicides, it is used as a surfactant to improve absorption of the herbicidal chemicals and reduces time the product takes to be rainfast, when enough of the herbicidal agent will be absorbed.

The chemical formula for this family of surfactants is CH_{3}(CH_{2})_{11}(OCH_{2}CH_{2})_{n}OSO_{3}Na. Sometimes the number represented by n is specified in the name, for example laureth-2 sulfate. The product is however heterogeneous in that the number of ethoxyl groups, where n is the mean. Laureth-3 sulfate is the most common one in commercial products. Compared to the parent sodium lauryl sulfate (CH_{3}(CH_{2})_{11}OSO_{3}Na), SLES is more surface-active owing to the presence of the ethoxy groups.

== Production ==
SLES is prepared by ethoxylation of dodecyl alcohol, which is produced industrially from palm kernel oil or coconut oil. The resulting ethoxylate is converted to a half ester of sulfuric acid, which is neutralized by conversion to the sodium salt.

The related surfactant sodium lauryl sulfate or SLS (also known as sodium dodecyl sulfate or SDS) is produced similarly, but without the ethoxylation step. SLS and ammonium lauryl sulfate (ALS) are commonly used alternatives to SLES in consumer products.

== Environmental impacts ==
SLES is toxic to aquatic animals. Low concentrations can cause severe effects and even death in fish.

== Safety ==
SLES does not induce any adverse responses in any toxicology testing. SLES is a skin and eye irritant but not a sensitizer.

SLES may retain trace amounts of the probable human carcinogen 1,4-dioxane, an unintended chemical by-product formed during the ethoxylation and subsequent sulfonation steps used to synthesize it. Since the presence of 1,4-dioxane was recognized, many manufacturers have implemented purification processes, such as vacuum and steam stripping, to reduce its concentration in finished products.

== See also ==
- Sodium lauroyl sarcosinate
- Sodium dodecyl sulfate
- Sodium myreth sulfate
- Sodium pareth sulfate
- Magnesium laureth sulfate
- Sodium dodecylbenzenesulfonate
