= 1-Fluorobutane =

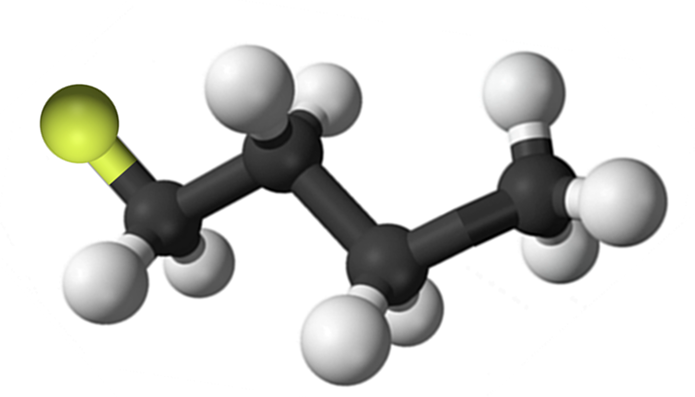

Names
- Preferred IUPAC name 1-Fluorobutane
- Other names Butyl fluoride

Identifiers
CAS Number	2366-52-1
3D model (JSmol)	Interactive image
Abbreviations	BuF n-BuF nBuF^{n}BuF
ChemSpider	16020
ECHA InfoCard	100.017.386
EC Number	219-123-8
PubChem CID	16908
UNII	JY35A6Z36D
CompTox Dashboard (EPA)	DTXSID4062351
- InChI: InChI=1S/C4H9F/c1-2-3-4-5/h2-4H2,1H3 Key: FCBJLBCGHCTPAQ-UHFFFAOYSA-N
- SMILES: CCCCF

Properties
Chemical formula	C_{4}H_{9}F
Molar mass	76.114 g·mol^{−1}
Appearance	Liquid
Density	0.779 g/cm^{3}
Melting point	−134 °C (−209 °F; 139 K)
Boiling point	32–33 °C (90–91 °F; 305–306 K)

Hazards
- GHS labelling
Pictograms	(GHS02: Flammable) (GHS07: Exclamation mark)
Signal word	Danger
Hazard statements	H224, H226, H315, H319, H335
Precautionary statements	P210, P233, P240, P241, P242, P243, P261, P264, P264+P265, P271, P280, P302+P352, P303+P361+P353, P304+P340, P305+P351+P338, P319, P321, P332+P317, P337+P317, P362+P364, P370+P378, P403+P233, P403+P235, P405, P501
- Except where otherwise noted, data are given for materials in their standard state (at 25 °C [77 °F], 100 kPa). Infobox references

1-Fluorobutane is the organofluorine compound with the formula C_{4}H_{9}F or CH_{3}(CH_{2})_{3}F. This compound belongs to the group of aliphatic, saturated halogenated hydrocarbons.

== Synthesis ==
1-Fluorobutane can be obtained by reacting 1-bromobutane with mercury(II) fluoride.

The compound can also be obtained by reacting 1-bromobutane with potassium fluoride in ethylene glycol.

== Physical properties ==
1-Fluorobutane is a low-temperature boiling liquid that is highly soluble in ethanol.

== Uses ==
1-Fluorobutane can be used to etch semiconductors.

== See also ==
- 1-Bromobutane
- 1-Chlorobutane
- 1-Iodobutane
- 2-Fluorobutane
