= Sodium myreth sulfate =

Names
- Other names PEG-(1-4) myristyl ether sulfate, sodium salt; POE(2) myristyl ether sulfate; sodium diethylene glycol myristyl ether sulfate; sodium myristyl ether sulfate

Identifiers
CAS Number	25446-80-4
3D model (JSmol)	Interactive image
Abbreviations	SMES
ChemSpider	83281
ECHA InfoCard	100.042.700
EC Number	246-986-8
PubChem CID	23682189
UNII	2VLC033A4E
CompTox Dashboard (EPA)	DTXSID6067096
- InChI: InChI=1S/C20H42O7S.Na/c1-2-3-4-5-6-7-8-9-10-11-12-13-14-24-15-16-25-17-18-26-19-20-27-28(21,22)23;/h2-20H2,1H3,(H,21,22,23);/q;+1/p-1 Key: MDSQKJDNWUMBQQ-UHFFFAOYSA-M
- SMILES: CCCCCCCCCCCCCCOCCOCCOCCOS(=O)(=O)[O-].[Na+]

Properties
Chemical formula	CH_{3}(CH_{2})_{13}(OCH_{2}CH_{2})_{n}OSO_{3}Na
Molar mass	448.590 g/mol
- Except where otherwise noted, data are given for materials in their standard state (at 25 °C [77 °F], 100 kPa). verify (what is ?) Infobox references

Sodium myreth sulfate is a mixture of organic compounds with both detergent and surfactant properties. It is found in many personal care products such as soaps, shampoos, and toothpaste. It is an inexpensive and effective foaming agent. Typical of many detergents, sodium myreth sulfate consists of several closely related compounds. Sometimes the number of ethylene glycol ether units (n) is specified in the name as myreth-n sulfate, for example myreth-2 sulfate.

== Production ==
Sodium myreth sulfate is very similar to sodium laureth sulfate; the only difference is two more carbons in the fatty alcohol portion of the hydrophobic tail. It is manufactured by ethoxylation (hence the "eth" in "myreth") of myristyl alcohol. Subsequently, the terminal OH group is converted to the sulfate by treatment with chlorosulfuric acid.

== Safety ==
Like other ethoxylates, sodium myreth sulfate may become contaminated with 1,4-dioxane during production, which is considered to be a Group 2B suspect carcinogen by the IARC.

== See also ==
- Ammonium lauryl sulfate
