= Butyl iodide =

Chemical compound

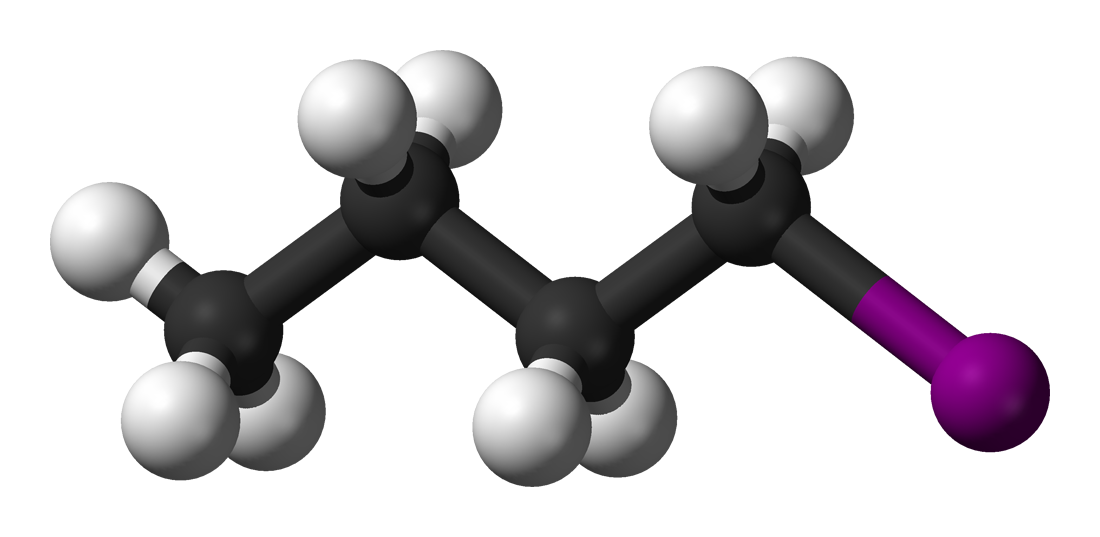
Ball and stick model of butyl iodide
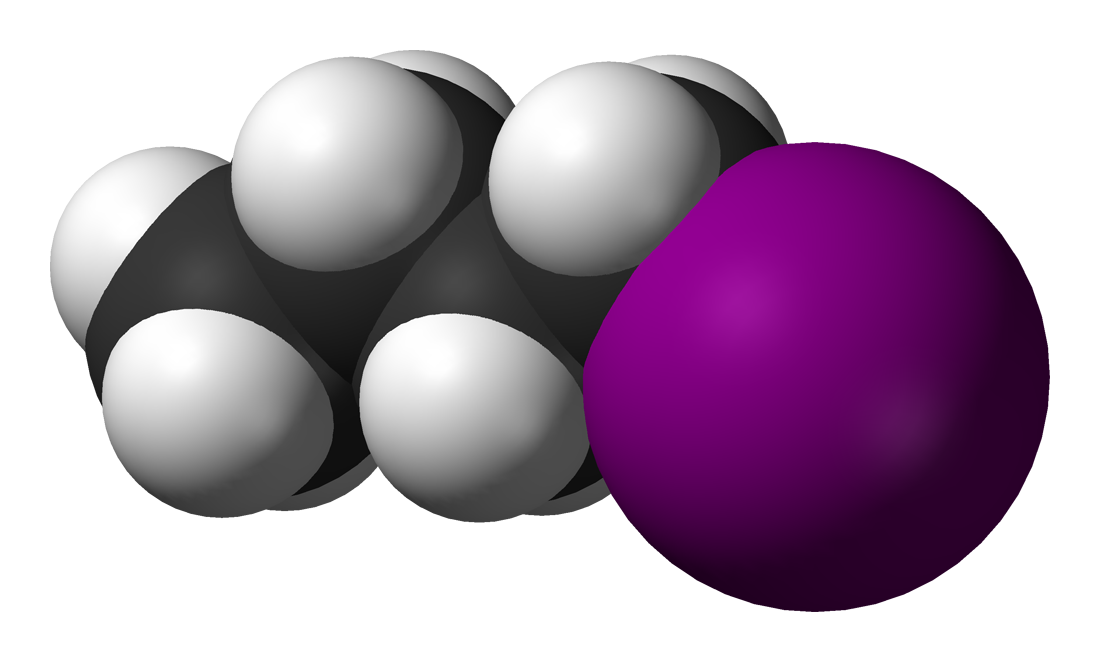
Space-filling model of butyl iodide

Names
- Preferred IUPAC name 1-Iodobutane

Identifiers
CAS Number	542-69-8
3D model (JSmol)	Interactive image
Abbreviations	BuI n-BuI nBuI^{n}BuI
Beilstein Reference	1420755
ChemSpider	10497
ECHA InfoCard	100.008.023
EC Number	208-824-4
MeSH	1-iodobutane
PubChem CID	10962
RTECS number	EK4400000
UNII	607A6CC46R
UN number	1993
CompTox Dashboard (EPA)	DTXSID70862157
- InChI: InChI=1S/C4H9I/c1-2-3-4-5/h2-4H2,1H3 Key: KMGBZBJJOKUPIA-UHFFFAOYSA-N
- SMILES: CCCCI

Properties
Chemical formula	C_{4}H_{9}I
Molar mass	184.020 g·mol^{−1}
Appearance	Colourless liquid
Density	1.617 g mL^{−1}
Melting point	−103.50 °C; −154.30 °F; 169.65 K
Boiling point	127 to 133 °C; 260 to 271 °F; 400 to 406 K
Henry's law constant (k_{H})	630 nmol Pa^{−1} kg^{−1}
Refractive index (n_{D})	1.4995

Hazards
- GHS labelling
Pictograms	(GHS02: Flammable) (GHS06: Toxic)
Signal word	Danger
Hazard statements	H226, H331
Precautionary statements	P261, P311
Flash point	33 °C (91 °F; 306 K)

Related compounds
Related alkanes	Propane; n-Propyl iodide; Isopropyl iodide; Butane; Pentane
Related compounds	Diiodohydroxypropane
- Except where otherwise noted, data are given for materials in their standard state (at 25 °C [77 °F], 100 kPa). verify (what is ?) Infobox references

Butyl iodide (1-iodobutane) is an organic compound which is an iodo derivative of butane. It is used as an alkylating agent.

== Isomers ==
The compounds sec-butyl iodide (2-iodobutane), isobutyl iodide (1-iodo-2-methylpropane), and tert-butyl iodide (2-iodo-2-methylpropane) are structural isomers of butyl iodide.

== See also ==
- 1-Bromobutane
- 1-Chlorobutane
- 1-Fluorobutane
