= 1-Bromobutane =

- Skeletal formula of 1-bromobutane with some implicit hydrogens shown

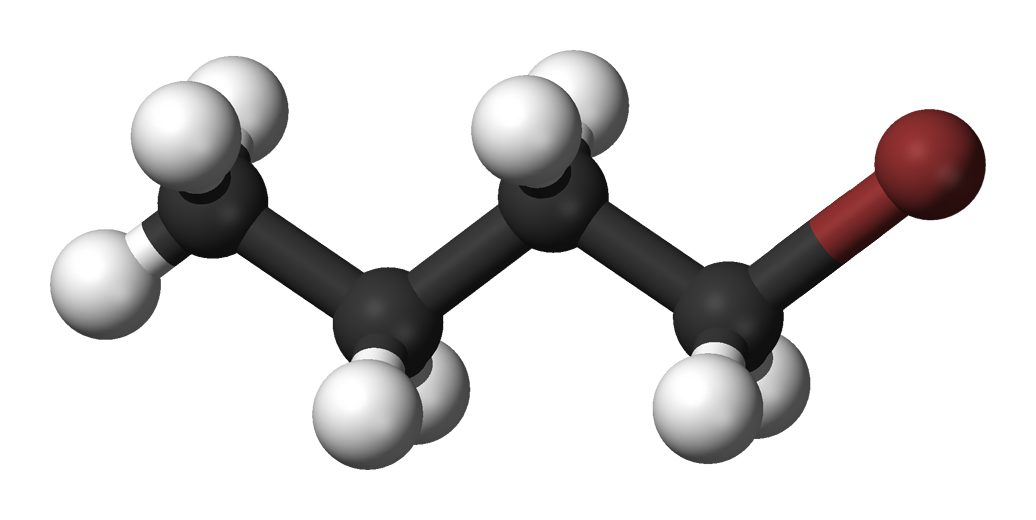
- Ball and stick model of 1-bromobutane

Names
- Preferred IUPAC name 1-Bromobutane
- Other names Butyl bromide

Identifiers
CAS Number	109-65-9
3D model (JSmol)	Interactive image
Abbreviations	BuBr n-BuBr nBuBr^{n}BuBr
Beilstein Reference	1098260
ChEBI	CHEBI:47231
ChEMBL	ChEMBL160949
ChemSpider	7711
ECHA InfoCard	100.003.357
EC Number	203-691-9
MeSH	butyl+bromide
PubChem CID	8002
RTECS number	EJ6225000
UNII	SAV6Y78U3D
UN number	1126
CompTox Dashboard (EPA)	DTXSID6021903
- InChI: InChI=1S/C4H9Br/c1-2-3-4-5/h2-4H2,1H3 Key: MPPPKRYCTPRNTB-UHFFFAOYSA-N
- SMILES: CCCCBr

Properties
Chemical formula	C_{4}H_{9}Br
Molar mass	137.020 g·mol^{−1}
Appearance	Colourless liquid
Density	1.2676 g mL^{−1}
Melting point	−112.5 °C; −170.4 °F; 160.7 K
Boiling point	101.4 to 102.9 °C; 214.4 to 217.1 °F; 374.5 to 376.0 K
log P	2.828
Vapor pressure	5.3 kPa
Henry's law constant (k_{H})	140 nmol Pa kg^{−1}
Refractive index (n_{D})	1.439

Thermochemistry
Heat capacity (C)	162.2 J K^{−1} mol^{−1}
Std molar entropy (S^{⦵}_{298})	327.02 J K^{−1} mol^{−1}
Std enthalpy of formation (Δ_{f}H^{⦵}_{298})	−148 kJ mol^{−1}
Std enthalpy of combustion (Δ_{c}H^{⦵}_{298})	−2.7178–−2.7152 MJ mol^{−1}

Hazards
- GHS labelling
Pictograms	(GHS02: Flammable) (GHS07: Exclamation mark) (GHS09: Environmental hazard)
Signal word	Danger
Hazard statements	H225, H315, H319, H335, H411
Precautionary statements	P210, P261, P273, P305+P351+P338
Flash point	10 °C (50 °F; 283 K)
Autoignition temperature	265 °C (509 °F; 538 K)
Explosive limits	2.8–6.6%
- Lethal dose or concentration (LD, LC)
LD_{50} (median dose)	2.761 g kg^{−1} (oral, rat)

Related compounds
Related alkanes	n-Propyl bromide; 2-Bromopropane; tert-Butyl bromide; 2-Bromobutane; 1-Bromohexane; 2-Bromohexane; 1-Bromododecane
- Except where otherwise noted, data are given for materials in their standard state (at 25 °C [77 °F], 100 kPa). verify (what is ?) Infobox references

1-Bromobutane is the organobromine compound with the formula C_{4}H_{9}Br or CH_{3}(CH_{2})_{3}Br. It is a colorless liquid, although impure samples appear yellowish. It is insoluble in water, but soluble in organic solvents. It is primarily used as a source of the butyl group in organic synthesis. It is one of several isomers of butyl bromide.

== Synthesis ==
Most 1-bromoalkanes are prepared by free-radical addition of hydrogen bromide to the 1-alkene. These conditions lead to the anti-Markovnikov addition, i.e. give the 1-bromo derivatives.

1-Bromobutane can also be prepared from butanol by treatment with hydrobromic acid:

CH_{3}(CH_{2})_{3}OH + HBr → CH_{3}(CH_{2})_{3}Br + H_{2}O

== Reactions ==
As a primary haloalkane, it is prone to S_{N}2 type reactions. It is commonly used as an alkylating agent. When combined with magnesium metal in dry ether, it gives the corresponding Grignard reagent. Such reagents are used to attach butyl groups to various substrates.

1-Bromobutane is the precursor to n-butyllithium:

2 Li + C_{4}H_{9}X → C_{4}H_{9}Li + LiX
where X = Cl, Br

The lithium for this reaction contains 1-3% sodium. When bromobutane is the precursor, the product is a homogeneous solution, consisting of a mixed cluster containing both LiBr and LiBu.

1-Fluorobutane can be obtained by reacting 1-bromobutane with potassium fluoride in ethylene glycol.

== See also ==
- 1-Chlorobutane
- 1-Fluorobutane
- 1-Iodobutane
