= Magnesium laureth sulfate =

Names
- Other names Magnesium laureth sulphate; Magnesium lauryl ether sulphate; Magnesium polyethylene glycol lauryl ether sulfate; Polyethylene glycol lauryl ether sulfate magnesium salt

Identifiers
| CAS Number | 62755-21-9 |
| ChemSpider | none |
| ECHA InfoCard | 100.117.245 |
| PubChem CID | 44150971 |
| UNII | 2OTJ9LF5UA |
| CompTox Dashboard (EPA) | DTXSID00860106 DTXSID90978406, DTXSID00860106 |

Properties
| Chemical formula | (C_{12}H_{26}SO_{4}(C_{2}H_{4}O)_{n})_{2}Mg |
| Molar mass | 819.3994 g/mol |
- Except where otherwise noted, data are given for materials in their standard state (at 25 °C [77 °F], 100 kPa). Infobox references

Magnesium laureth sulfate is the magnesium salt of laureth sulfate (2-dodecoxyethylsulfate), which is in turn the ester of laureth (2-dodecoxylethanol) and sulfuric acid. It is used mainly in the chemical industry for the preparation of specialized shampoos for people of delicate skin. It works even in hard water. Other uses include baby products (lotions, oils, powders, and creams), eye makeup remover, and skin cleansers.

Magnesium laureth sulfate is considered to be a safe cosmetic ingredient provided that it is formulated to be non-irritating using present practices of use and concentration.

== See also ==
- Sodium laureth sulfate
