= Sodium pareth sulfate =

Names
- Other names Sodium C12-13 alketh sulfate, Sodium C12-13 pareth sulfate, Sodium alkylpolyoxyethylene sulfate, Sodium C10-16 alketh sulfate; alcohols, C10-16, ethoxylated, sulfates, sodium salts

Identifiers
CAS Number	68585-34-2
ECHA InfoCard	100.105.713
EC Number	500-223-8
CompTox Dashboard (EPA)	DTXSID2028725

Properties
Chemical formula	CH_{3}(CH_{2})_{n}(OCH_{2}CH_{2})_{m}OSO_{3}Na
Molar mass	Variable
- Except where otherwise noted, data are given for materials in their standard state (at 25 °C [77 °F], 100 kPa). Infobox references

Sodium alketh sulfate, known prior to being renamed in 2021 as sodium pareth sulfate, and also as sodium alkylpolyoxyethylene sulfate, is a surfactant found in some detergent products such as hand or body washes, but not as commonly as other chemicals such as sodium laureth sulfate (SLES). It is the sodium salt of a sulfated polyethylene glycol ether.

In February 2021, the Personal Care Products Council announced a revision of INCI nomenclature that included replacement of the term "pareth" with "alketh" in all INCI names, affecting hundreds of INCI names.

It is produced similarly to SLES starting from fatty alcohols with 10 to 16 carbon atoms.
