= Sodium laurate =

Names
- Preferred IUPAC name Sodium dodecanoate

Identifiers
CAS Number	629-25-4
3D model (JSmol)	Interactive image
ChEBI	CHEBI:131839
ChEMBL	ChEMBL556792
ChemSpider	11873
ECHA InfoCard	100.010.076
EC Number	211-082-4
PubChem CID	2735067
RTECS number	OF0700000
UNII	K146MR5EXO
CompTox Dashboard (EPA)	DTXSID9044453
- InChI: InChI=1S/C12H24O2.Na/c1-2-3-4-5-6-7-8-9-10-11-12(13)14;/h2-11H2,1H3,(H,13,14);/q;+1/p-1 Key: BTURAGWYSMTVOW-UHFFFAOYSA-M
- SMILES: [Na+].[O-]C(=O)CCCCCCCCCCC

Properties
Chemical formula	C_{12}H_{23}NaO_{2}
Molar mass	222.304 g·mol^{−1}
Density	1.102 g/ml
Melting point	244 to 246 °C (471 to 475 °F; 517 to 519 K)

Hazards
- GHS labelling
Pictograms	(GHS05: Corrosive) (GHS07: Exclamation mark)
Signal word	Danger
Hazard statements	H315, H318, H319, H335
Precautionary statements	P261, P264, P271, P280, P302+P352, P304+P340, P305+P351+P338, P310, P312, P321, P332+P313, P337+P313, P362, P403+P233, P405, P501
- Except where otherwise noted, data are given for materials in their standard state (at 25 °C [77 °F], 100 kPa). Infobox references

Sodium laurate is a chemical compound with formula CH_{3}(CH_{2})_{10}CO_{2}Na. As the sodium salt of a fatty acid (lauric acid), it is classified as a soap. It is a white solid.

== Use ==
Sodium laurate is frequently used in bars of soap as an ingredient. Sodium laurate is also a permitted bleaching, washing and peeling agent.

Sodium laurate has also been used to induce peripheral arterial disease in rats.
