= 2-Bromobutane =

Structural formula of (R)-2-Bromobutane
Structural formula of (S)-2-Bromobutane

Names
- Preferred IUPAC name 2-Bromobutane
- Other names sec-Butylbromide

Identifiers
CAS Number	78-76-2; 5787-33-7 R; 5787-32-6 S
3D model (JSmol)	Interactive image; R: Interactive image; S: Interactive image
Abbreviations	2-BB s-BB; SBB s-BuBr sBuBr^{s}BuBr
Beilstein Reference	505949
ChEMBL	ChEMBL156276
ChemSpider	6306; 552796 R
ECHA InfoCard	100.001.037
EC Number	201-140-7
MeSH	2-bromobutane
PubChem CID	6554; 637147 R; 12236140 S
RTECS number	EJ6228000
UNII	SSI829JO4W; 1P61Z14PRH R; 2AL1MZU0XA S
UN number	2339
CompTox Dashboard (EPA)	DTXSID7021499
- InChI: InChI=1S/C4H9Br/c1-3-4(2)5/h4H,3H2,1-2H3 Key: UPSXAPQYNGXVBF-UHFFFAOYSA-N
- SMILES: CCC(C)Br; R: CC[C@@H](C)Br; S: CC[C@H](C)Br

Properties
Chemical formula	C_{4}H_{9}Br
Molar mass	137.020 g·mol^{−1}
Appearance	Colourless liquid
Density	1.255 g mL^{−1}
Melting point	−112.65 °C; −170.77 °F; 160.50 K
Boiling point	91 °C; 196 °F; 364 K
log P	2.672
Refractive index (n_{D})	1.437

Thermochemistry
Std enthalpy of formation (Δ_{f}H^{⦵}_{298})	−156 kJ mol^{−1}
Std enthalpy of combustion (Δ_{c}H^{⦵}_{298})	−2.706–−2.704 MJ mol^{−1}

Hazards
- GHS labelling
Pictograms	(GHS02: Flammable)
Signal word	Danger
Hazard statements	H225
Precautionary statements	P210
Flash point	21 °C (70 °F; 294 K)

Related compounds
Related alkanes	n-Propyl bromide; 2-Bromopropane; tert-Butyl bromide; 1-Bromobutane; 1-Bromohexane; 2-Bromohexane
- Except where otherwise noted, data are given for materials in their standard state (at 25 °C [77 °F], 100 kPa). verify (what is ?) Infobox references

2-Bromobutane is an isomer of 1-bromobutane. Both compounds share the molecular formula C_{4}H_{9}Br. 2-Bromobutane is also known as sec-butyl bromide or methylethylbromomethane. It is a colorless liquid with a pleasant odor. Because it contains bromine, a halogen, it is part of a larger class of compounds known as alkyl halides. Because the carbon atom connected to the bromine is connected to two other carbons the molecule is referred to as a secondary alkyl halide. 2-Bromobutane is chiral and thus can be obtained as either of two enantiomers designated as (R)-(−)-2-bromobutane and (S)-(+)-2-bromobutane.

2-Bromobutane is relatively stable, but is toxic and flammable. When treated with a strong base, it is prone to undergo an E2 reaction, which is a bimolecular elimination reaction, resulting in (predominantly) 2-butene, an alkene (double bond). 2-Bromobutane is an irritant, and harmful if ingested. It can irritate and burn skin and eyes.
