= Sodium dodecyl sulfate =

Organic sulfate and anionic surfactant

Sodium lauryl sulfate
- Structural formula of the sodium dodecyl sulfate

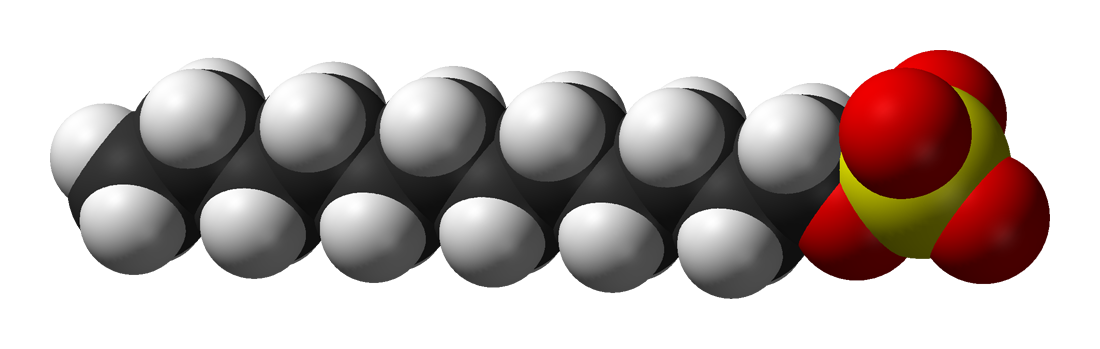
- Space-filling model of the dodecyl sulfate ion

Names
- Preferred IUPAC name Sodium dodecyl sulfate
- Other names Sodium monododecyl sulfate; Sodium lauryl sulfate; Sodium monolauryl sulfate; Sodium dodecanesulfate; dodecyl alcohol, hydrogen sulfate, sodium salt; n-dodecyl sulfate sodium; Sulfuric acid monododecyl ester sodium salt

Identifiers
CAS Number	151-21-3
3D model (JSmol)	Interactive image
ChEBI	CHEBI:8984
ChEMBL	ChEMBL23393
ChemSpider	8677
DrugBank	DB00815
ECHA InfoCard	100.005.263
E number	E487 (thickeners, ...)
PubChem CID	3423265
UNII	368GB5141J
CompTox Dashboard (EPA)	DTXSID1026031
- InChI: InChI=1S/C12H26O4S.Na/c1-2-3-4-5-6-7-8-9-10-11-12-16-17(13,14)15;/h2-12H2,1H3,(H,13,14,15);/q;+1/p-1 Key: DBMJMQXJHONAFJ-UHFFFAOYSA-M
- SMILES: CCCCCCCCCCCCOS(=O)([O-])=O.[Na+]

Properties
Chemical formula	C_{12}H_{25}NaO_{4}S
Molar mass	288.38 g·mol^{−1}
Appearance	white or cream-colored solid
Odor	odorless
Density	1.01 g/cm^{3}
Melting point	206 °C (403 °F; 479 K)
- Surface tension
CMC	8.2 mM at 25 °C
Refractive index (n_{D})	1.461

Pharmacology
ATC code	A06AG11 (WHO)

Hazards
- Lethal dose or concentration (LD, LC)
LD_{50} (median dose)	1288 mg/kg (rat, oral)

Related compounds
Other anions	Sodium laureth sulfate Sodium myreth sulfate
Other cations	Ammonium lauryl sulfate Potassium lauryl sulfate
- Except where otherwise noted, data are given for materials in their standard state (at 25 °C [77 °F], 100 kPa). verify (what is ?) Infobox references

Sodium dodecyl sulfate (SDS) or sodium lauryl sulfate (SLS), sometimes written sodium laurilsulfate, is an organic compound with the formula CH_{3}(CH_{2})_{11}OSO_{3}Na and structure H_{3}C−(CH_{2})_{11}−O−S(=O)_{2}−O^{−}Na^{+}. It is an anionic surfactant used in many cleaning and hygiene products. This compound is the sodium salt of the 12-carbon organosulfate. Its hydrocarbon tail combined with a polar "headgroup" gives the compound amphiphilic properties that make it useful as a detergent. SLS is also component of mixtures produced from inexpensive coconut and palm oils. SLS is a common component of many cleaning, personal hygiene and cosmetic, pharmaceutical, and food products, as well as of industrial and commercial cleaning and product formulations.

== Physicochemical properties ==
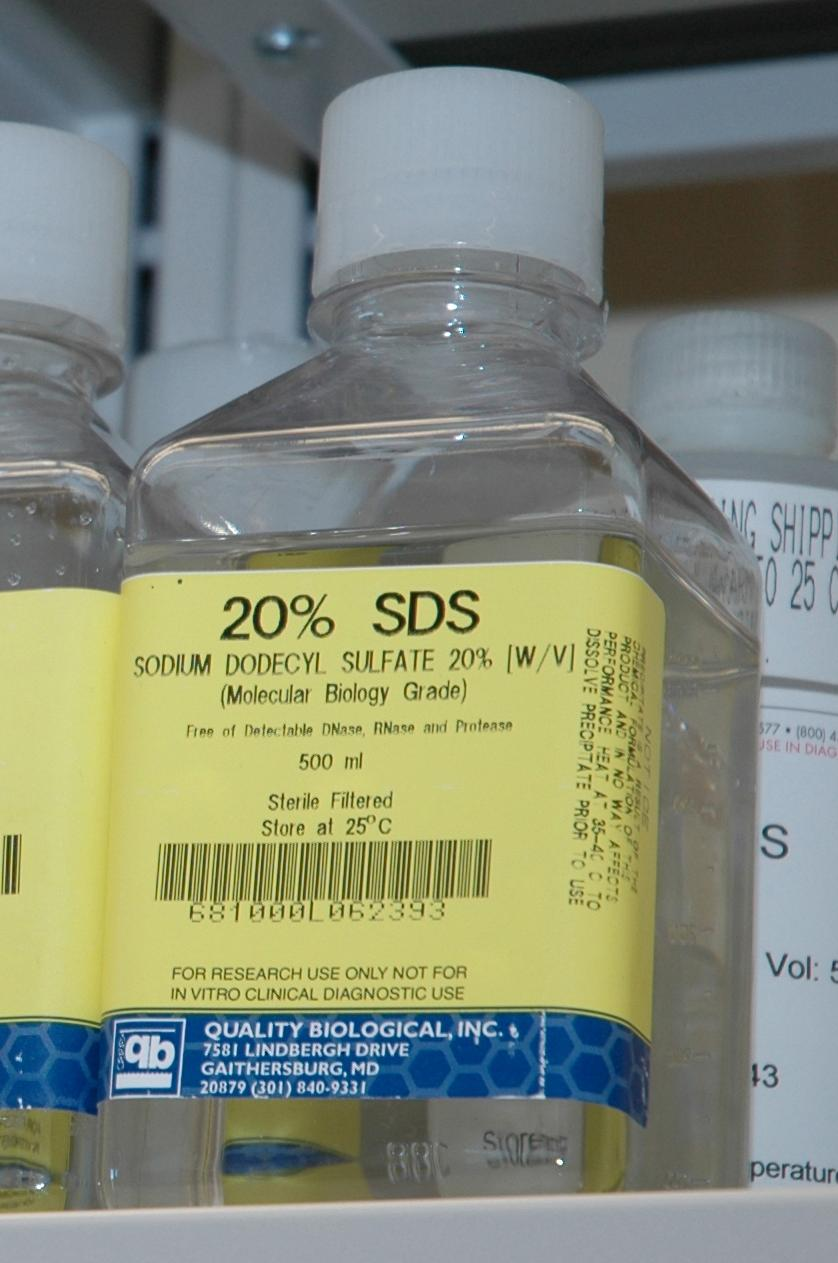
Bottle of 20% sodium dodecyl sulfate in distilled water for use in the laboratory

The critical micelle concentration (CMC) in water at 25 °C is 8.2 mM, and the aggregation number at this concentration is usually considered to be about 62. The micelle ionization fraction (α) is around 0.3 (or 30%).

== Applications ==
=== Cleaning and hygiene ===
SLS is used in detergents for laundry and other cleaning applications. It is a highly effective surfactant and is used in tasks requiring the removal of oily stains and residues. It is found in high concentrations in industrial products including engine degreasers, floor cleaners, and car exterior cleaners.

It is a component in hand soap, toothpastes, shampoos, shaving creams, and bubble bath formulations, for its ability to create a foam (lather), for its surfactant properties, and in part for its thickening effect.

=== Food additive ===
Sodium dodecyl sulfate, appearing as its synonym sodium lauryl sulfate (SLS), is considered a generally recognized as safe (GRAS) ingredient for food use according to the USFDA (21 CFR 172.822). It is used as an emulsifying agent and whipping aid. As an emulsifier in or with egg whites the United States Code of Federal Regulations require that it must not exceed 1,000 parts per million (0.1%) in egg white solids or 125 parts per million (0.0125%) in frozen or liquid egg whites and as a whipping agent for the preparation of marshmallows it must not exceed 0.5% of the weight of gelatine. SLS is reported to temporarily diminish perception of sweetness.

=== Laboratory applications ===
SLS is used in cleaning procedures, and is commonly used as a component for lysing cells during RNA extraction or DNA extraction, inhibiting the activity of nucleases, enzymes that can degrade DNA, protecting the integrity of the isolated genetic material, and for denaturing proteins in preparation for electrophoresis in the SDS-PAGE technique.

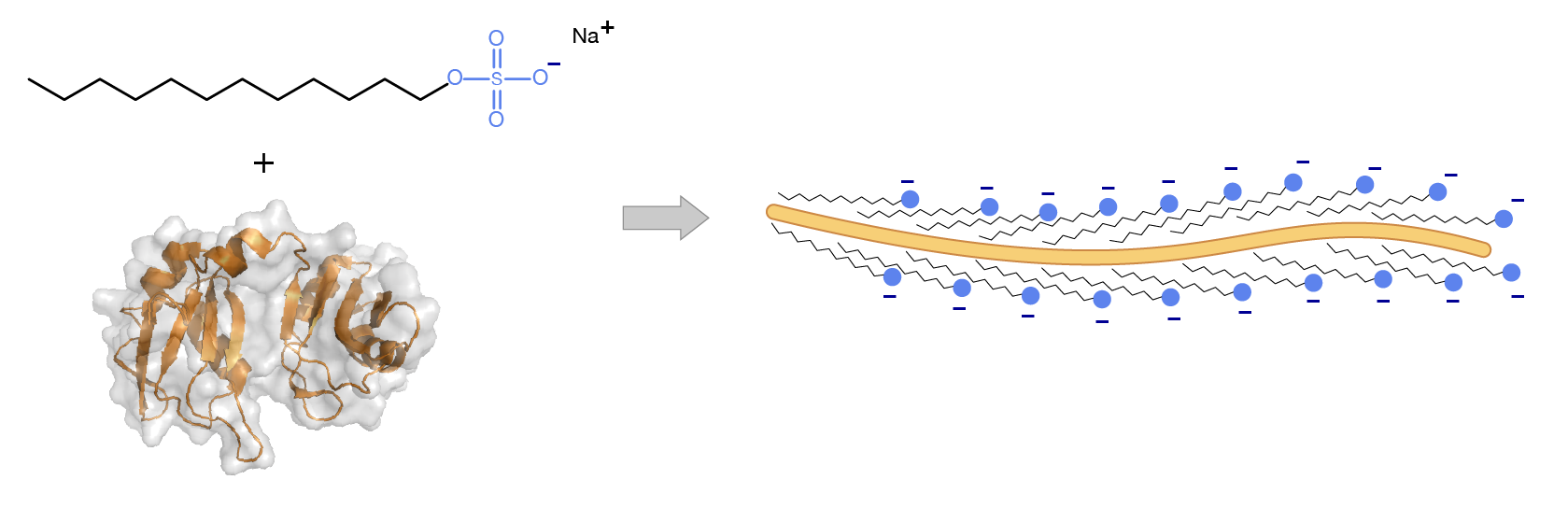
Denaturation of a protein using SLS

In the case of SDS-PAGE, the compound works by disrupting non-covalent bonds in the proteins, and so denaturing them, i.e. causing the protein molecules to lose their native conformations and shapes. By binding to proteins at a ratio of one SLS molecule per 2 amino acid residues, the negatively charged detergent provides all proteins with a similar net negative charge and therefore a similar charge-to-mass ratio. In this way, the difference in mobility of the polypeptide chains in the gel can be attributed solely to their length as opposed to both their native charge and shape. This separation based on the size of the polypeptide chain simplifies the analysis of protein molecules.

==== Pharmaceutical applications ====
Sodium lauryl sulfate is a widely used in the pharmaceutical field as an ionic solubilizer and emulsifier that is suitable for applications in liquid dispersions, solutions, emulsions and micro emulsions, tablets, foams and semi-solids such as creams, lotions and gels. Additionally, SLS aids in tablet wettability, as well as lubrication during manufacturing. Brand names of pharma-grade SLS include Kolliphor SLS and Kolliphor SLS Fine.

==== Miscellaneous applications ====
SLS is used in an improved technique for preparing brain tissues for study by optical microscopy. The technique, which has been branded as CLARITY, was the work of Karl Deisseroth and coworkers at Stanford University, and involves infusion of the organ with an acrylamide solution to bind the macromolecules of the organ (proteins, nucleic acids, etc.), followed by thermal polymerization to form a "brain–hydrogel" (a mesh interspersed throughout the tissue to fix the macromolecules and other structures in space), and then by lipid removal using SLS to eliminate light scattering with minimal protein loss, rendering the tissue quasi-transparent.

Along with sodium dodecylbenzene sulfonate and Triton X-100, aqueous solutions of SLS are popular for dispersing or suspending nanotubes, such as carbon nanotubes.

=== Other uses ===
SLS has been proposed as a potentially effective topical microbicide, for intravaginal use, to inhibit and possibly prevent infection by various enveloped and non-enveloped viruses such as the herpes simplex viruses, HIV, and the Semliki Forest virus.

Liquid membranes formed from SLS in water have been demonstrated to work as unusual particle separators. The device acts as a reverse filter, allowing large particles to pass while capturing smaller particles.

== Production ==
Dodecyl alcohol is sulfated using sulfur trioxide. The reaction proceeds by initial formation of the pyrosulfate:

2 SO_{3} + ROH → ROSO_{2}−O−SO_{3}H
ROSO_{2}−O−SO_{3}H → ROSO_{3}H + SO_{3}

Several million tons are produced annually.

SLS can also be synthesized by treating lauryl alcohol with chlorosulfuric acid. The resulting half ester of sulfuric acid is then neutralized with alkali.

Lauryl alcohol can be used in pure form or as a mixtures of fatty alcohols. When produced from these sources, "SLS" products are a mixture of various sodium alkyl sulfates with SLS being the main component. For instance, SLS is a component, along with other chain-length amphiphiles, when produced from coconut oil, and is known as sodium coco sulfate (SCS). SLS is available commercially in powder, pellet, and other forms (each differing in rates of dissolution), as well as in aqueous solutions of varying concentrations.

== Safety ==
SLS is not carcinogenic in low concentrations according to some studies. Like all detergents, sodium lauryl sulfate removes oils from the skin, and can cause skin and eye irritation. It has been shown to irritate the skin of the face, with prolonged and constant exposure (more than an hour) in young adults. SLS may worsen skin problems in individuals with chronic skin hypersensitivity, with some people being affected more than others.

=== Oral concerns ===
SLS is a common ingredient in toothpastes due to its low cost, its lack of impact on taste, and its desirable action as a foaming agent.

==== VSCs ====
SLS may reduce the amount of bad breath-causing volatile sulfur compounds (VSCs) in the mouth. A series of small crossover studies (25–34 patients) have supported the efficacy of SLS in the reduction of VSCs, and its related positive impact on breath malodor, although these studies have been generally noted to reflect technical challenges in the control of study design variables.

==== Dry mouth ====
Primary sources from the group of Irma Rantanen at University of Turku, Finland claim that SLS-containing pastes cause more dry mouth (xerostomia) than their proposed alternative. A 2011 Cochrane review of these studies, and of the more general area, concludes that there "is no strong evidence... that any topical therapy is effective for relieving the symptom of dry mouth."

==== Mouth ulceration ====
A safety concern has been raised on the basis of several studies regarding the effect of toothpaste SLS on aphthous ulcers (more specifically, mouth ulcers or "canker sores"), commonly referred to as canker or white sores. According to the NHS and Alessandro Villa of the Miami Cancer Institute, SLS is a cause for concern for mouth ulcers. As Lippert notes, of 2013, "very few... marketed toothpastes contain a surfactant other than SLS [SDS]," and leading manufacturers continue to formulate their produce with SLS. According to Allesandro Villa of the Miami Cancer Institute, one theory is that SLS disrupts the protective layer of mucus covering the mouth.

== See also ==
- Sodium tetradecyl sulfate, another anionic surfactant in common use
