= 2-Bromohexane =

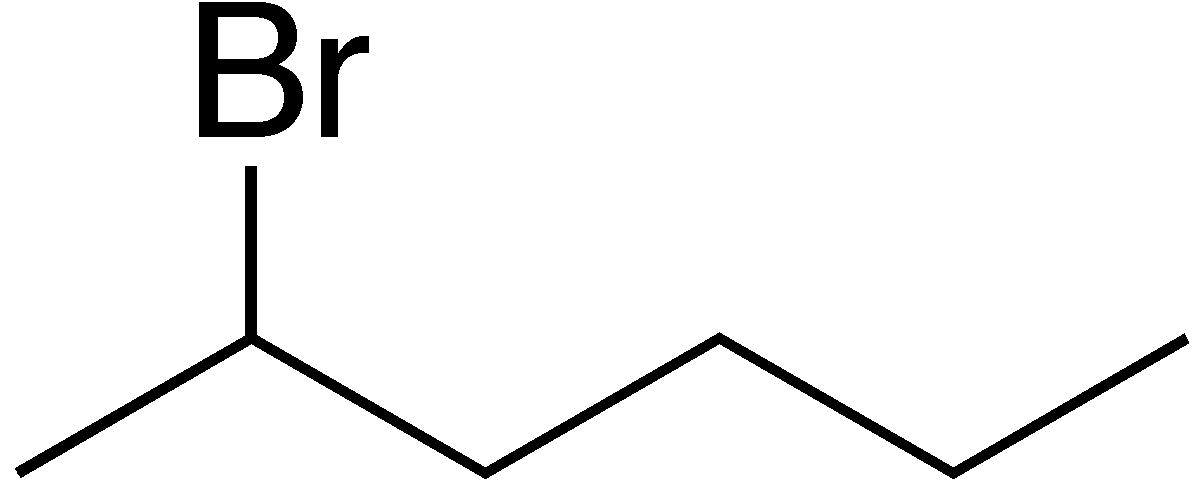
- Structural formula of 2-Bromohexane

Names
- Preferred IUPAC name 2-Bromohexane
- Other names 2-Hexyl bromide

Identifiers
CAS Number	3377-86-4
3D model (JSmol)	Interactive image
ChemSpider	17757
ECHA InfoCard	100.020.159
EC Number	222-173-3
PubChem CID	18805
UNII	RU9D9G6PF6
CompTox Dashboard (EPA)	DTXSID60871016
- InChI: InChI=1S/C6H13Br/c1-3-4-5-6(2)7/h6H,3-5H2,1-2H3 Key: NEBYCXAKZCQWAW-UHFFFAOYSA-N
- SMILES: CCCCC(C)Br

Properties
Chemical formula	C_{6}H_{13}Br
Molar mass	165.074 g·mol^{−1}
Appearance	Colorless liquid
Density	1.1891 g mL^{−1}
Boiling point	143 °C (289 °F; 416 K)

Hazards
Flash point	47 °C (117 °F; 320 K)

Related compounds
Related alkanes	1-Bromobutane; 2-Bromobutane; 1-Bromohexane
- Except where otherwise noted, data are given for materials in their standard state (at 25 °C [77 °F], 100 kPa). verify (what is ?) Infobox references

2-Bromohexane is the organobromine compound with the formula CH_{3}CH(Br)(CH_{2})_{3}CH_{3}. It is a colorless liquid. The compound is chiral. Most 2-bromoalkanes are prepared by addition of hydrogen bromide to the 1-alkene. Markovnikov addition proceeds in the absence of free-radicals, i.e. give the 2-bromo derivatives.
