= Tert-Butyl bromide =

tert-Butyl bromide
- Skeletal formula of tert-butyl bromide with all implicit hydrogens shown

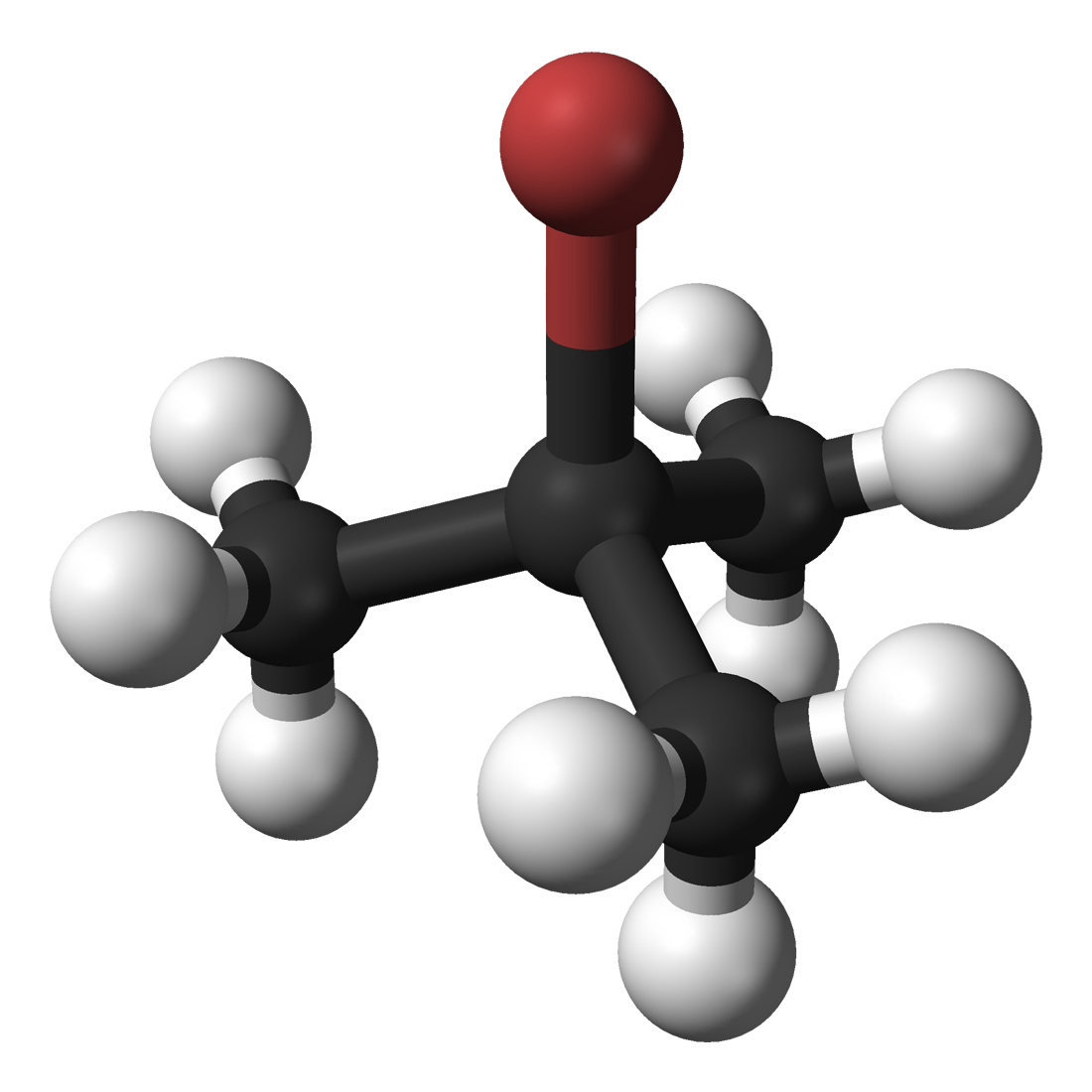
- Ball and stick model of tert-butyl bromide

Names
- Preferred IUPAC name 2-Bromo-2-methylpropane
- Other names: 1-Bromo-1,1-dimethylethane; Bromotrimethylmethane; 1,1-Dimethylethyl bromide; Trimethylbromomethane

Identifiers
CAS Number	507-19-7
3D model (JSmol)	Interactive image
Abbreviations	Me_{3}CBr t-BuBr tBuBr^{t}BuBr
Beilstein Reference	1730892
ChEMBL	ChEMBL347644
ChemSpider	10053
ECHA InfoCard	100.007.333
EC Number	208-065-9
PubChem CID	10485
RTECS number	TX4150000
UNII	5LWO08435U
UN number	2342
CompTox Dashboard (EPA)	DTXSID5060144
- InChI: InChI=1S/C4H9Br/c1-4(2,3)5/h1-3H3 Key: RKSOPLXZQNSWAS-UHFFFAOYSA-N
- SMILES: CC(C)(C)Br

Properties
Chemical formula	C_{4}H_{9}Br
Molar mass	137.020 g·mol^{−1}
Appearance	Colorless liquid
Density	1.22 g mL^{−1} (at 20 °C)
Melting point	−16.20 °C; 2.84 °F; 256.95 K
Boiling point	73.3 °C; 163.8 °F; 346.4 K
log P	2.574
Henry's law constant (k_{H})	310 nmol Pa^{−1} kg^{−1}
Refractive index (n_{D})	1.4279

Thermochemistry
Heat capacity (C)	165.7 J K mol^{−1}
Std enthalpy of formation (Δ_{f}H^{⦵}_{298})	−133.4 kJ mol^{−1}

Hazards
- GHS labelling
Pictograms	(GHS02: Flammable)
Signal word	Danger
Hazard statements	H225
Precautionary statements	P210
Flash point	16 °C (61 °F; 289 K)
- Lethal dose or concentration (LD, LC)
LD_{50} (median dose)	1.25 g kg^{−1} (intraperitoneal, rat); 4.4 g kg^{−1} (intraperitoneal, mouse)

Related compounds
Related alkanes	Bromoethane; n-Propyl bromide; 2-Bromopropane; 1-Bromobutane; 2-Bromobutane
- Except where otherwise noted, data are given for materials in their standard state (at 25 °C [77 °F], 100 kPa). verify (what is ?) Infobox references

tert-Butyl bromide (also referred to as 2-bromo-2-methylpropane) is an organic compound with the formula Me_{3}CBr (Me = methyl). The molecule features a tert-butyl group attached to a bromide substituent. This organobromine compound is used as a standard reagent in synthetic organic chemistry. It is a colorless liquid.

== Reactions ==
It is used to introduce tert-butyl groups. Illustrative is the tert-butylation of cyclopentadiene to give di-tert-butylcyclopentadiene:

C_{5}H_{6} + 2 NaOH + 2 Me_{3}CBr → (Me_{3}C)_{2}C_{5}H_{4} + 2 NaBr + 2 H_{2}O

== Other aspects ==
tert-Butyl bromide used to study the massive deadenylation of adenine based-nucleosides induced by halogenated alkanes (alkyl halides) under physiological conditions. 2-Bromo-2-methylpropane causes the massive deguanylation of guanine based-nucleosides and massive deadenylation of adenine based-nucleosides.

Phase transition from orthorhombic Pmn21 phase III at low temperatures (measurements from 95 K), to a disordered rhombohedral phase II at 205-213 K. Phase II can exist from 213-223 K, partly coincident with an FCC phase I, which can be observed between 210-250 K. Phase transitions have also been studied at high pressure (up to 300MPa)
