= Organosulfate =

Organic compounds of the form R–O–SO3 (charge –1)

Generic structure of an organosulfate, where R is an organyl group

In organosulfur chemistry, organosulfates are a class of organic compounds sharing a common functional group with the structure R−O−SO^{−}_{3}. The SO_{4} core is a sulfate group and the R group is any organic residue. All organosulfates are formally esters derived from alcohols and sulfuric acid (H_{2}SO_{4}) although many are not prepared in this way. Many sulfate esters are used in detergents, and some are useful reagents. Alkyl sulfates consist of a hydrophobic hydrocarbon chain, a polar sulfate group (containing an anion) and either a cation or amine to neutralize the sulfate group. Examples include: sodium lauryl sulfate (also known as sulfuric acid mono dodecyl ester sodium salt) and related potassium and ammonium salts.

== Applications ==
Alkyl sulfates are commonly used as anionic surfactants in liquid soaps and detergents used to clean wool, as surface cleaners, and as active ingredients in laundry detergents, shampoos and conditioners. They can also be found in household products such as toothpaste, antacids, cosmetics and foods. Generally they are found in consumer products at concentrations ranging from 3-20%. In 2003 approximately 118,000 t/a of alkyl sulfates were used in the US.

== Synthetic organosulfates ==
A common example is sodium lauryl sulfate, with the formula CH_{3}(CH_{2})_{11}OSO_{3}Na. Also common in consumer products are the sulfate esters of ethoxylated fatty alcohols such as those derived from lauryl alcohol. An example is sodium laureth sulfate, an ingredient in some cosmetics.

Alkylsulfate can be produced from alcohols, which in turn are obtained by hydrogenation of animal or vegetable oils and fats or using the Ziegler process or through oxo synthesis. If produced from oleochemical feedstock or the Ziegler process, the hydrocarbon chain of the alcohol will be linear. If derived using the oxo process, a low level of branching will appear usually with a methyl or ethyl group at the C-2 position, containing even and odd amounts of alkyl chains. These alcohols react with chlorosulfuric acid:

ClSO_{3}H + RCH_{2}OH → RCH_{2}OSO_{3}H + HCl

Alternatively, alcohols can be converted to the half sulfate esters using sulfur trioxide:

SO_{3} + RCH_{2}OH → RCH_{2}OSO_{3}H

=== Laboratory routes ===
Specialized organosulfates can be prepared by the Elbs persulfate oxidation of phenols and the Boyland–Sims oxidation of anilines.

== Dialkylsulfates ==
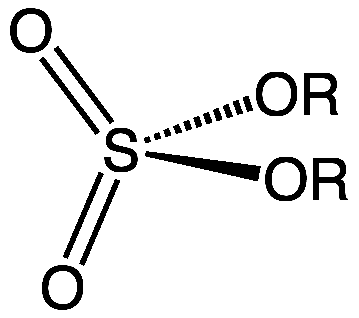
Structure of a diorganosulfate.

A less common family of organosulfates have the formula RO-SO_{2}-OR'. They are prepared from sulfuric acid and the alcohol. The main examples are diethyl sulfate and dimethyl sulfate, colourless liquids that are used as reagents in organic synthesis. These compounds are potentially dangerous alkylating agents. Dialkylsulfates do not occur in nature.

== Natural sulfate esters ==
Heparin is a medication and naturally occurring organosulfate.

Several classes of sulfate esters exist in nature. Especially common are sugar derivatives, the sulfated polysaccharides. Examples include keratan sulfate, chondroitin sulfate, and the anticoagulant heparin. Post-translational modifications of some proteins entail sulfation, often at the phenol group of tyrosine residues. A steroidal sulfate is estradiol sulfate, a latent precursor to the hormone estrogen.

A major portion of soil sulfur is in the form of sulfate esters.

=== Metabolism ===
Sulfate is an inert anion, so biological systems often activate it by the formation of ester derivative of adenosine 5'-phosphosulfate (APS) and 3'-phosphoadenosine-5'-phosphosulfate (PAPS). Many organisms utilize these reactions for metabolic purposes or for the biosynthesis of sulfur compounds required for life. The formation and hydrolysis of natural sulfate esters are catalyzed by sulfatases (aka sulfohydrolases).

== Safety ==
Because they are widely used in commercial products, the safety aspects of (monoalkyl) organosulfates are heavily investigated.

=== Human Health ===
Alkyl sulfates if ingested are well-absorbed and are metabolized into a C_{3}, C_{4} or C_{5} sulfate and an additional metabolite. The highest irritant of the alkyl sulfates is sodium laurylsulfate, with the threshold before irritation at a concentration of 20%. Surfactants in consumer products are typically mixed, reducing likelihood of irritation. According to OECD TG 406, alkyl sulfates in animal studies were not found to be skin sensitizers.

Laboratory studies have not found alkyl sulfates to be genotoxic, mutagenic or carcinogenic. No long-term reproductive effects have been found.

=== Environment ===
The primary disposal of alkyl sulfate from used commercial products is wastewater. The concentration of alkylsulfates in effluent from waste water treatment plants (WWTP) has been measured at 10 micrograms per litre (5.8×10^{−9} oz/cu in) and lower. Alkyl sulfates biodegrade easily, even starting likely before reaching the WWTP. Once at the treatment plant, they are rapidly removed by biodegradation. Invertebrates were found to be the most-sensitive trophic group to alkyl sulfates. Sodium laurylsulfate tested on Uronema parduczi, a protozoan, was found to have the lowest effect value with the 20 h-EC5 being 0.75 milligrams per litre (2.7×10^{−8} lb/cu in). Chronic exposure tests with C_{12} to C_{18} with the invertebrate Ceriodaphnia dubia found the highest toxicity is with C_{14} (NOEC was 0.045 mg/L).

In terms of thermal stability, alkyl sulfates degrade well before reaching their boiling point due to low vapor pressure (for C_{8-18} from 10-11 to 10-15 hPa). Soil sorption is proportional to carbon chain length, with a length of 14 and more having the highest sorption rate. Soil concentrations have been found to vary from 0.0035 to 0.21 milligrams per kilogram (5.6×10^{−8} to 3.4×10^{−6} oz/lb) dw.

== History ==
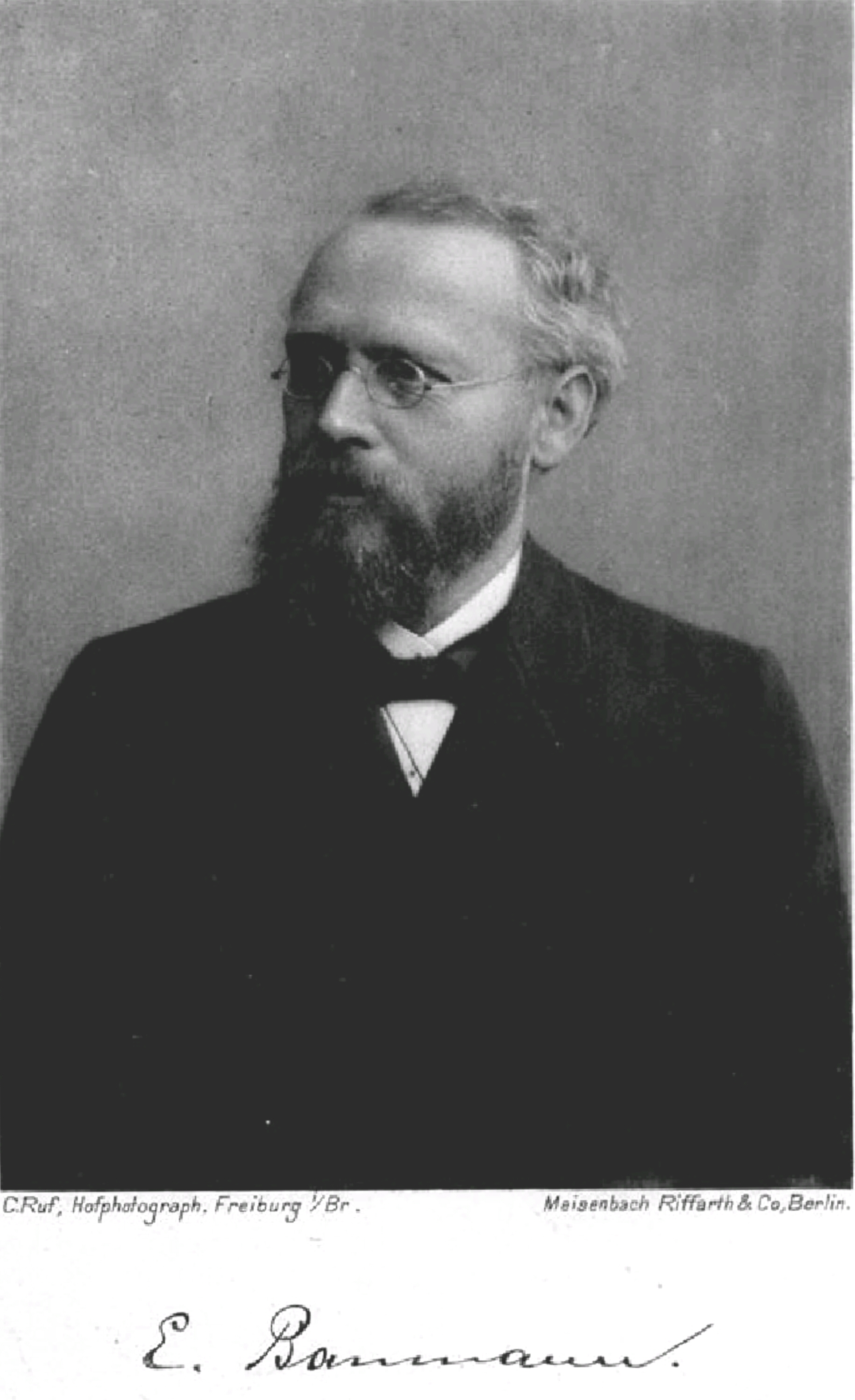
Eugen Baumann

Eugen Baumann discovered in the 19th century that phenol is metabolized to potassium phenyl sulfate (depicted)

Since the late 19th century, numerous natural compounds containing sulphate groups have been identified. For example, the plant toxin atractyloside was discovered as early as 1873 in gum spindle weed. Shortly thereafter, the biotransformation of toxic substances into sulphuric acid esters in living organisms (sulphation) was elucidated. In 1876, Eugen Baumann reported the isolation of an unknown compound from urine. He initially misidentified it as a sulphonic acid, but soon correctly determined it to be phenyl sulphate. In subsequent studies, he demonstrated that ingested phenol is metabolized to this compound in humans and dogs, that the sulphate is substantially less toxic than phenol itself, and that pyrocatechol and indole likewise form sulphate conjugates. The mustard oil glycosides, or glucosinolates, from the cruciferous plants are among the earliest discovered natural sulphates. Several representatives of this group were isolated between 1897 and 1899, including gluconasturtiin from watercress and sinalbin from white mustard. Another class of natural sulphuric acid esters comprises flavonoid derivatives; the first identified member, persicarin, was isolated from water pepper in 1937. Heparin, a naturally occurring anticoagulant involved in anticoagulation, was discovered in 1916 and has been used therapeutically since 1935. phosphoadenosine phosphosulphate is a chemically activated form of the sulphate ion used in living organisms for the biosynthesis of sulphuric acid esters. This molecule was discovered in the 1950s, and its structure and biosynthesis were subsequently elucidated.

In 1835, Eugène-Melchior Péligot and Jean-Baptiste Dumas first synthesized dimethyl sulfate and diethyl sulfate by distilling methanol and ethanol, respectively, with sulphuric acid. Around 1900, industrial production of dimethyl sulphate from sulphur trioxide and dimethyl ether commenced in Lyon. In the 20th century, various synthetic routes were developed for the preparation of sulphuric acid esters. In the 1930s and 1940s, for example, methods were established for the esterification of alcohols using sulphur trioxide and its complexes.
