= Isobutyl fluoride =

1-Fluoro-2-methylpropane
- Structural formula

Names
- Preferred IUPAC name 1-Fluoro-2-methylpropane

Identifiers
CAS Number	359-00-2
3D model (JSmol)	Interactive image
Abbreviations	IFB i-FB i-BuF iBuF^{i}BuF
ChemSpider	10326324
PubChem CID	13665913
CompTox Dashboard (EPA)	DTXSID901028436
- InChI: InChI=1S/C4H9F/c1-4(2)3-5/h4H,3H2,1-2H3 Key: WGCJTTUVWKJDAX-UHFFFAOYSA-N
- SMILES: CC(C)CF

Properties
Chemical formula	C_{4}H_{9}F
Molar mass	76.114 g·mol^{−1}
Density	0.75 g/cm^{3} (estimated)
Melting point	−110.8 °C (−167.4 °F; 162.3 K) estimated
Boiling point	22–25.1 °C (71.6–77.2 °F; 295.1–298.2 K)
Solubility in water	Insoluble
Refractive index (n_{D})	1.333
- Except where otherwise noted, data are given for materials in their standard state (at 25 °C [77 °F], 100 kPa). Infobox references

Isobutyl fluoride is a primary alkyl fluoride with the formula C_{4}H_{9}F or CH_{3}CH(CH_{3})CH_{2}F.
