= 1-Bromohexane =

Chemical compound

- Structural formula of 1-Bromohexane

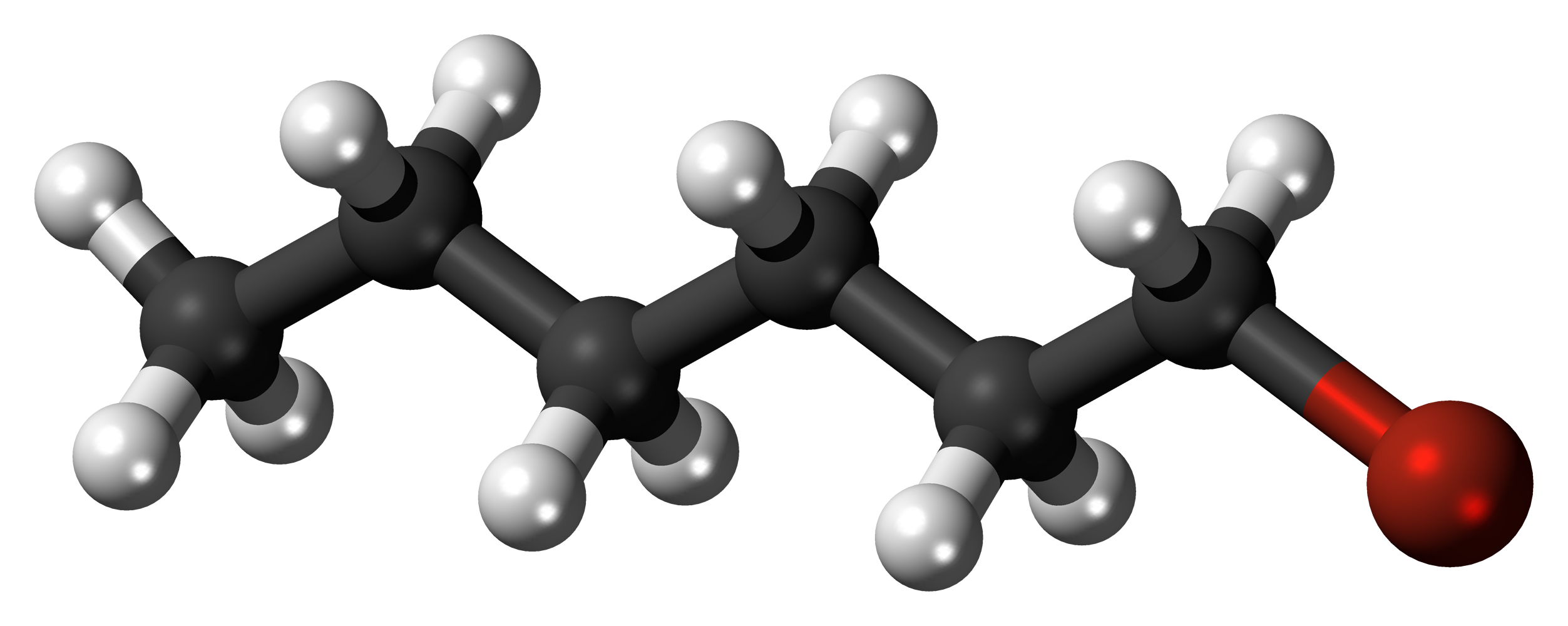
- Ball and stick model of 1-Bromohexane

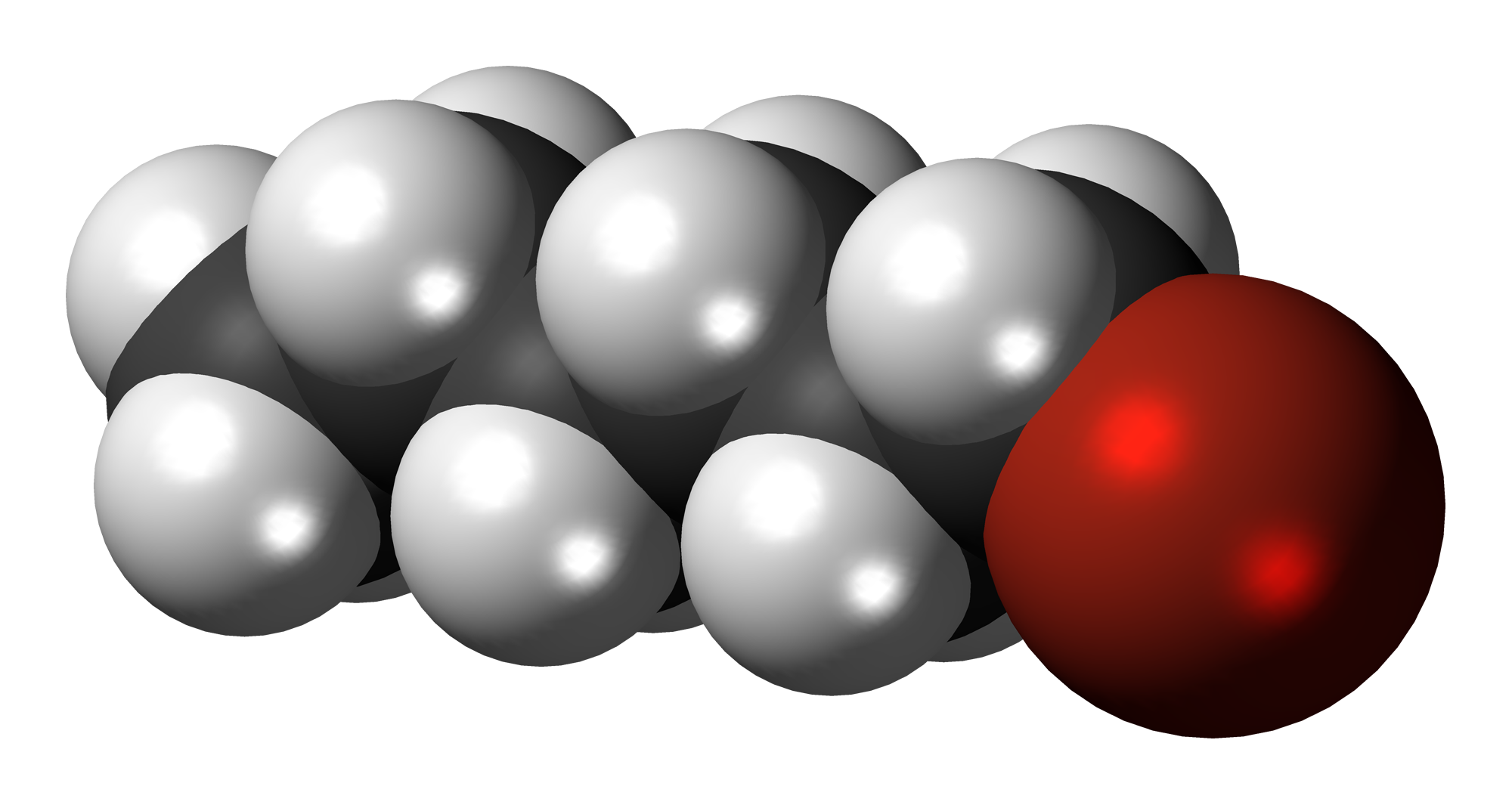
- Space-filling model of 1-Bromohexane

Names
- Preferred IUPAC name 1-Bromohexane
- Other names: Bromohexane; Hexyl bromide}; 1-Hexyl bromide; n-Hexyl bromide

Identifiers
CAS Number	111-25-1
3D model (JSmol)	Interactive image
Abbreviations	HxBr n-HxBr nHxBr^{n}HxBr
Beilstein Reference	1731290
ChemSpider	7810
ECHA InfoCard	100.003.501
EC Number	203-850-2
MeSH	1-bromohexane
PubChem CID	8101
RTECS number	MO0925000
UNII	WVA0FAX7GA
UN number	1993
CompTox Dashboard (EPA)	DTXSID4021929
- InChI: InChI=1S/C6H13Br/c1-2-3-4-5-6-7/h2-6H2,1H3 Key: MNDIARAMWBIKFW-UHFFFAOYSA-N
- SMILES: CCCCCCBr

Properties
Chemical formula	C_{6}H_{13}Br
Molar mass	165.074 g·mol^{−1}
Appearance	Colorless liquid
Density	1.176 g/mL
Melting point	−84.70 °C; −120.46 °F; 188.45 K
Boiling point	154 to 158 °C; 309 to 316 °F; 427 to 431 K
Solubility in water	Insoluble
Solubility	Alcohol, ether
Refractive index (n_{D})	1.448 (20 °C, D)

Thermochemistry
Heat capacity (C)	219.7 J K^{−1} mol^{−1}
Std molar entropy (S^{⦵}_{298})	452.92 J K^{−1} mol^{−1}
Std enthalpy of formation (Δ_{f}H^{⦵}_{298})	−196.1–−192.9 kJ mol^{−1}
Std enthalpy of combustion (Δ_{c}H^{⦵}_{298})	−4026.2–−4023.0 kJ mol^{−1}

Hazards
- GHS labelling
Pictograms	(GHS02: Flammable) (GHS07: Exclamation mark)
Signal word	Warning
Hazard statements	H226, H315, H319, H335
Precautionary statements	P261, P305+P351+P338
NFPA 704 (fire diamond)	1 2 0
Flash point	57 °C (135 °F; 330 K)
- Lethal dose or concentration (LD, LC)
LD_{50} (median dose)	1.226 g/kg (IP, mouse)

Related compounds
Related alkanes	1-Bromobutane; 1-Bromododecane; 2-Bromobutane; 2-Bromohexane
- Except where otherwise noted, data are given for materials in their standard state (at 25 °C [77 °F], 100 kPa). verify (what is ?) Infobox references

1-Bromohexane is organobromine compound with formula Br(CH_{2})_{5}CH_{3}. It is a colorless liquid.

== Synthesis and reactions ==
Most 1-bromoalkanes are prepared by free-radical addition of hydrogen bromide to the 1-alkene. These conditions lead to anti-Markovnikov addition, giving the 1-bromo derivative.

1-Bromohexane undergoes reactions expected of simple alkyl bromides. It can form Grignard reagents. It reacts with potassium fluoride to give the corresponding fluorocarbons.

== See also ==
- 1-Fluorohexane
- 1-Chlorohexane
- 1-Iodohexane
- Bromoalkanes
- Bromocyclohexane
- Bromocyclopropane
