= Dodecanal =

Names
- Preferred IUPAC name Dodecanal
- Other names Lauraldehyde; Dodecyl aldehyde

Identifiers
CAS Number	112-54-9
3D model (JSmol)	Interactive image
ChEBI	CHEBI:27836
ChemSpider	7902
ECHA InfoCard	100.003.621
PubChem CID	8194
UNII	C42O120SEF
CompTox Dashboard (EPA)	DTXSID6021589
- InChI: InChI=1S/C12H24O/c1-2-3-4-5-6-7-8-9-10-11-12-13/h12H,2-11H2,1H3 Key: HFJRKMMYBMWEAD-UHFFFAOYSA-N; InChI=1/C12H24O/c1-2-3-4-5-6-7-8-9-10-11-12-13/h12H,2-11H2,1H3 Key: HFJRKMMYBMWEAD-UHFFFAOYAZ
- SMILES: O=CCCCCCCCCCCC

Properties
Chemical formula	C_{12}H_{24}O
Molar mass	184.323 g·mol^{−1}
Appearance	Colorless liquid
Density	0.83 g cm^{−3}
Melting point	12 °C (54 °F; 285 K)
Boiling point	257 °C (495 °F; 530 K)

Hazards
- GHS labelling
Pictograms	(GHS07: Exclamation mark) (GHS09: Environmental hazard)
Signal word	Warning
Hazard statements	H315, H411
Precautionary statements	P273, P302+P352
Flash point	114 °C (237 °F; 387 K)

Related compounds
Related	Dodecanol; Dodecanoic acid
- Except where otherwise noted, data are given for materials in their standard state (at 25 °C [77 °F], 100 kPa). Infobox references

Dodecanal, also known as lauraldehyde or dodecyl aldehyde, is an organic compound with the chemical formula C_{12}H_{24}O or CH_{3}(CH_{2})_{10}CHO. This colourless liquid is a component of many fragrances. It occurs naturally in citrus oils, but commercial samples are usually produced from dodecanol by dehydrogenation.
