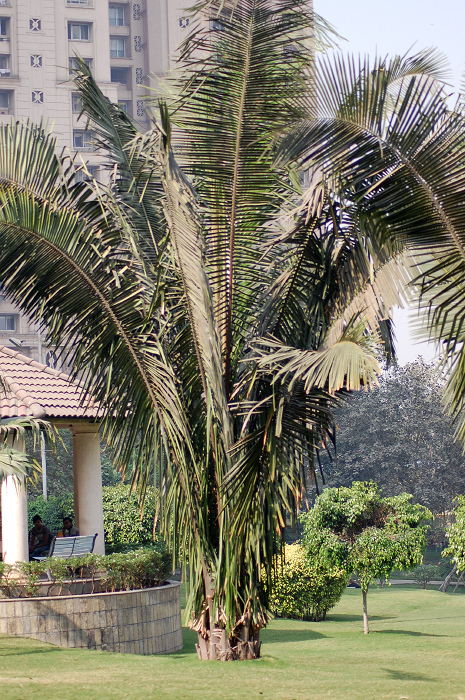

Scientific classification
- Kingdom: Plantae
- Clade: Tracheophytes
- Clade: Angiosperms
- Clade: Monocots
- Clade: Commelinids
- Order: Arecales
- Family: Arecaceae
- Genus: Attalea
- Species: A. cohune

Binomial name
- Attalea cohune Mart.

= Attalea cohune =

Cohune palm

Species of palm

Attalea cohune, commonly known as the cohune palm (also rain tree, American oil palm, corozo palm or manaca palm), is a species of palm tree native to Mexico and parts of Central America.

The cohune palm is used in the production of cohune oil and its nut can be used as a variety of vegetable ivory.

== Example occurrences ==
A chief occurrence as a dominant plant is in the Belizean pine forests ecoregion.
