= Tert-Butyl fluoride =

tert-Butyl fluoride
- Structural formula

Names
- Preferred IUPAC name 2-Fluoro-2-methylpropane
- Other names 1,1-Dimethylethyl fluoride 1-Fluoro-1,1-dimethylethane; Fluorotrimethylmethane; Trimethylfluoromethane tert-butyl fluoride t-butyl fluoride

Identifiers
CAS Number	353-61-7
3D model (JSmol)	Interactive image
Abbreviations	TBF t-BF; Me_{3}CF t-BuF tBuF^{t}BuF
ChemSpider	9249
EC Number	206-538-4
PubChem CID	9626
UNII	ZZ4ZMV2APJ
CompTox Dashboard (EPA)	DTXSID1059860
- InChI: InChI=1S/C4H9F/c1-4(2,3)5/h1-3H3 Key: GSMZLBOYBDRGBN-UHFFFAOYSA-N
- SMILES: CC(C)(C)F

Properties
Chemical formula	C_{4}H_{9}F
Molar mass	76.114 g·mol^{−1}
Appearance	Colorless liquid or gas
Odor	Faint, sweet, ether-like
Density	0.7527 g/cm^{3}
Melting point	−77 °C (−107 °F; 196 K)
Boiling point	12.1–28 °C (53.8–82.4 °F; 285.2–301.1 K)
Solubility in water	Insoluble
Vapor pressure	708 mmHg at 25 °C
Dipole moment	1.96 D
- Except where otherwise noted, data are given for materials in their standard state (at 25 °C [77 °F], 100 kPa). Infobox references

tert-Butyl fluoride is an organofluorine compound with the formula C_{4}H_{9}F or CH_{3}CF(CH_{3})CH_{3}, abbreviated as Me_{3}CF (Me = methyl). At standard conditions it is a colorless liquid or gas.
