= Lauric acid =

12-Carbon fatty acid

- Skeletal formula of lauric acid

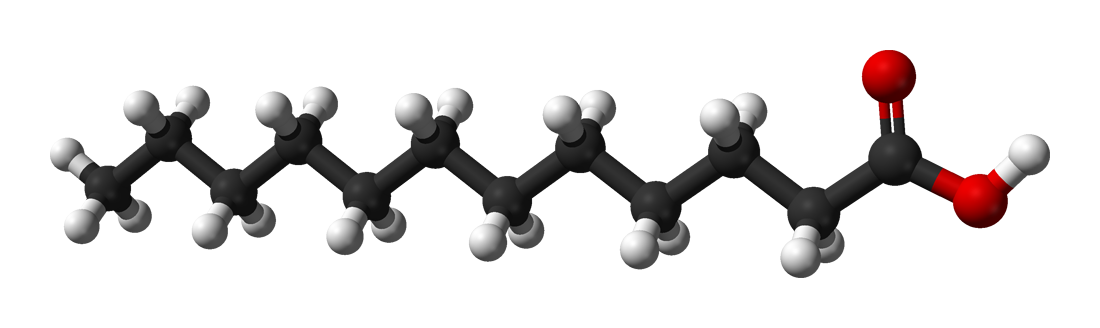

Names
- Preferred IUPAC name Dodecanoic acid
- Other names n-Dodecanoic acid, Dodecylic acid, Dodecoic acid, Laurostearic acid, Vulvic acid, 1-Undecanecarboxylic acid, Duodecylic acid, C12:0 (Lipid numbers)

Identifiers
CAS Number	143-07-7
3D model (JSmol)	Interactive image
ChEBI	CHEBI:30805
ChEMBL	ChEMBL108766
ChemSpider	3756
ECHA InfoCard	100.005.075
EC Number	205-582-1
IUPHAR/BPS	5534
KEGG	C02679
PubChem CID	3893
UNII	1160N9NU9U
CompTox Dashboard (EPA)	DTXSID5021590
- InChI: InChI=1S/C12H24O2/c1-2-3-4-5-6-7-8-9-10-11-12(13)14/h2-11H2,1H3,(H,13,14) Key: POULHZVOKOAJMA-UHFFFAOYSA-N; InChI=1/C12H24O2/c1-2-3-4-5-6-7-8-9-10-11-12(13)14/h2-11H2,1H3,(H,13,14) Key: POULHZVOKOAJMA-UHFFFAOYAP
- SMILES: O=C(O)CCCCCCCCCCC

Properties
Chemical formula	C_{12}H_{24}O_{2}
Molar mass	200.322 g·mol^{−1}
Appearance	White powder
Odor	Slight odor of bay oil
Density	1.007 g/cm^{3} (24 °C); 0.8744 g/cm^{3} (41.5 °C); 0.8679 g/cm^{3} (50 °C)
Melting point	43.8 °C (110.8 °F; 316.9 K)
Boiling point	297.9 °C (568.2 °F; 571.0 K); 282.5 °C (540.5 °F; 555.6 K) at 512 mmHg; 225.1 °C (437.2 °F; 498.2 K) at 100 mmHg
Solubility in water	37 mg/L (0 °C); 55 mg/L (20 °C); 63 mg/L (30 °C); 72 mg/L (45 °C); 83 mg/L (100 °C)
Solubility	Soluble in alcohols, diethyl ether, phenyls, haloalkanes, acetates
Solubility in methanol	12.7 g/100 g (0 °C); 120 g/100 g (20 °C); 2250 g/100 g (40 °C)
Solubility in acetone	8.95 g/100 g (0 °C); 60.5 g/100 g (20 °C); 1590 g/100 g (40 °C)
Solubility in ethyl acetate	9.4 g/100 g (0 °C); 52 g/100 g (20°C); 1250 g/100 g (40°C)
Solubility in toluene	15.3 g/100 g (0 °C); 97 g/100 g (20°C); 1410 g/100 g (40°C)
log P	4.6
Vapor pressure	2.13·10^{−6} kPa (25 °C); 0.42 kPa (150 °C); 6.67 kPa (210 °C)
Acidity (pK_{a})	5.3 (20 °C)
Thermal conductivity	0.442 W/m·K (solid); 0.1921 W/m·K (72.5 °C); 0.1748 W/m·K (106 °C)
Refractive index (n_{D})	1.423 (70 °C); 1.4183 (82 °C)
Viscosity	6.88 cP (50 °C); 5.37 cP (60 °C)

Structure
Crystal structure	Monoclinic (α-form); Triclinic, aP228 (γ-form)
Space group	P2_{1}/a, No. 14 (α-form); P1̅, No. 2 (γ-form)
Point group	2/m (α-form); 1̅ (γ-form)
Lattice constant	a = 9.524 Å, b = 4.965 Å, c = 35.39 Å (α-form) α = 90°, β = 129.22°, γ = 90°

Thermochemistry
Heat capacity (C)	404.28 J/mol·K
Std enthalpy of formation (Δ_{f}H^{⦵}_{298})	−775.6 kJ/mol
Std enthalpy of combustion (Δ_{c}H^{⦵}_{298})	7377 kJ/mol; 7425.8 kJ/mol (292 K)

Hazards
- GHS labelling
Pictograms	(GHS05: Corrosive)
Signal word	Danger
Hazard statements	H318
Precautionary statements	P280, P305+P351+P338
NFPA 704 (fire diamond)	1 1 1
Flash point	> 113 °C (235 °F; 386 K)

Related compounds
Related compounds	Glyceryl laurate

Related compounds
Related compounds	Undecanoic acid Tridecanoic acid Dodecanol; Dodecanal; Sodium lauryl sulfate
- Except where otherwise noted, data are given for materials in their standard state (at 25 °C [77 °F], 100 kPa). verify (what is ?) Infobox references

Lauric acid, systematically dodecanoic acid, is a saturated fatty acid with a 12-carbon atom chain (C12:0 in lipid numbers). It is a typical medium-chain fatty acid. It is a bright white, powdery solid with a faint odor of bay oil or soap. The salts and esters of lauric acid are known as laurates. Lauric acid accounts for nearly half of the fat in coconut oil and palm kernel oil.

It was named after laurel oil by Theodor Marsson, who separated it from laurel fat in 1842.

== Occurrence ==
Lauric acid, as a component of triglycerides, comprises about half of the fatty-acid content in coconut milk, coconut oil, laurel oil, and palm kernel oil (not to be confused with palm oil). Oils with high levels of lauric acid are known as lauric oils. Otherwise, it is relatively uncommon. It is also found in human breast milk (6.2% of total fat), cow's milk (2.9%), and goat's milk (3.1%).

=== In various plants ===
- The palm tree Attalea speciosa, a species known in Brazil as babassu – 50% in babassu oil
- The laurel Laurus nobilis – berry oil, 54%; whole berry, 28%.
- Attalea cohune, the cohune palm (also rain tree, American oil palm, corozo palm or manaca palm) – 46.5% in cohune oil
- Astrocaryum murumuru (Arecaceae) a palm native to the Amazon – 47.5% in "murumuru butter"
- Coconut oil 47-49%
- Pycnanthus kombo (African nutmeg)
- Virola surinamensis (wild nutmeg) 7.8–11.5%
- Peach palm seed 10.4%
- Betel nut 9%
- Date palm seed 0.56–5.4%
- Macadamia nut 0.072–1.1%
- Plum 0.35–0.38%
- Watermelon seed 0.33%
- Viburnum opulus 0.24-0.33%
- Citrullus lanatus (egusi melon)
- Pumpkin flower 205 ppm, pumpkin seed 472 ppm

=== Insect ===
- Black soldier fly Hermetia illucens 30–50 mg/100 mg fat.

== Uses ==
Like many other fatty acids, lauric acid is inexpensive, has a long shelf-life, is nontoxic, and is safe to handle. It is used mainly for the production of soaps and cosmetics. For these purposes, lauric acid is reacted with sodium hydroxide to give sodium laurate, which is a soap. Most commonly, sodium laurate is obtained by saponification of various oils, such as coconut oil. These precursors give mixtures of sodium laurate and other soaps.

Lauric acid is a precursor to dilauroyl peroxide, a commercial initiator of polymerizations.

== Production and reactions ==
Lauric acid is mainly isolated from natural sources. Its reactions are representative of those of similar long chain, saturated fatty acids. It can be converted to the symmetrical fatty ketone called laurone (O=C(C_{11}H_{23})_{2}). It transesterifies with vinyl acetate. Treatment with sulfur trioxide gives the α-sulfonic acid.

== In human health ==
=== Metabolism ===
Although 95% of medium-chain triglycerides are absorbed through the portal vein, only 25–30% of lauric acid is absorbed through this vein.

=== Cardiovascular risk factor ===
Lauric acid increases total serum lipoproteins more than many other fatty acids, including LDL and high-density lipoprotein (HDL), making it a risk factor for cardiovascular diseases. Lauric acid has been characterized as having "a more favorable effect on total HDL than any other fatty acid [examined], either saturated or unsaturated", which may favor a lower cardiovascular disease risk. However, given the prominence of lauric acid in palm kernel and coconut oil (about 47% of total fat), replacing dietary coconut oil and its high lauric acid content with oils containing mostly unsaturated fats would alter total blood lipids in a way that reduces cardiovascular disease risk.
