= Potassium lauryl sulfate =

Names
- Preferred IUPAC name Potassium dodecyl sulfate
- Other names Dodecyl potassium sulfate; Potassium lauryl sulphate; Potassium dodecyl sulphate

Identifiers
CAS Number	4706-78-9
3D model (JSmol)	Interactive image
ChemSpider	56317
ECHA InfoCard	100.022.900
PubChem CID	62549
UNII	PS6855FO7F
CompTox Dashboard (EPA)	DTXSID40884104
- InChI: InChI=1S/C12H26O4S.K/c1-2-3-4-5-6-7-8-9-10-11-12-16-17(13,14)15;/h2-12H2,1H3,(H,13,14,15);/q;+1/p-1 Key: ONQDVAFWWYYXHM-UHFFFAOYSA-M; InChI=1/C12H26O4S.K/c1-2-3-4-5-6-7-8-9-10-11-12-16-17(13,14)15;/h2-12H2,1H3,(H,13,14,15);/q;+1/p-1 Key: ONQDVAFWWYYXHM-REWHXWOFAH
- SMILES: [K+].[O-]S(=O)(=O)OCCCCCCCCCCCC

Properties
Chemical formula	C_{12}H_{25}KO_{4}S
Molar mass	304.49 g·mol^{−1}
- Except where otherwise noted, data are given for materials in their standard state (at 25 °C [77 °F], 100 kPa). Infobox references

Potassium lauryl sulfate (potassium dodecyl sulfate) a detergent similar to sodium lauryl sulfate. Potassium lauryl sulfate is used in mud soaps. It has a better cleansing action indicated by the presence of the potassium ion (refer Fajans' rules).
