= Tert-Butyl iodide =

tert-Butyl iodide

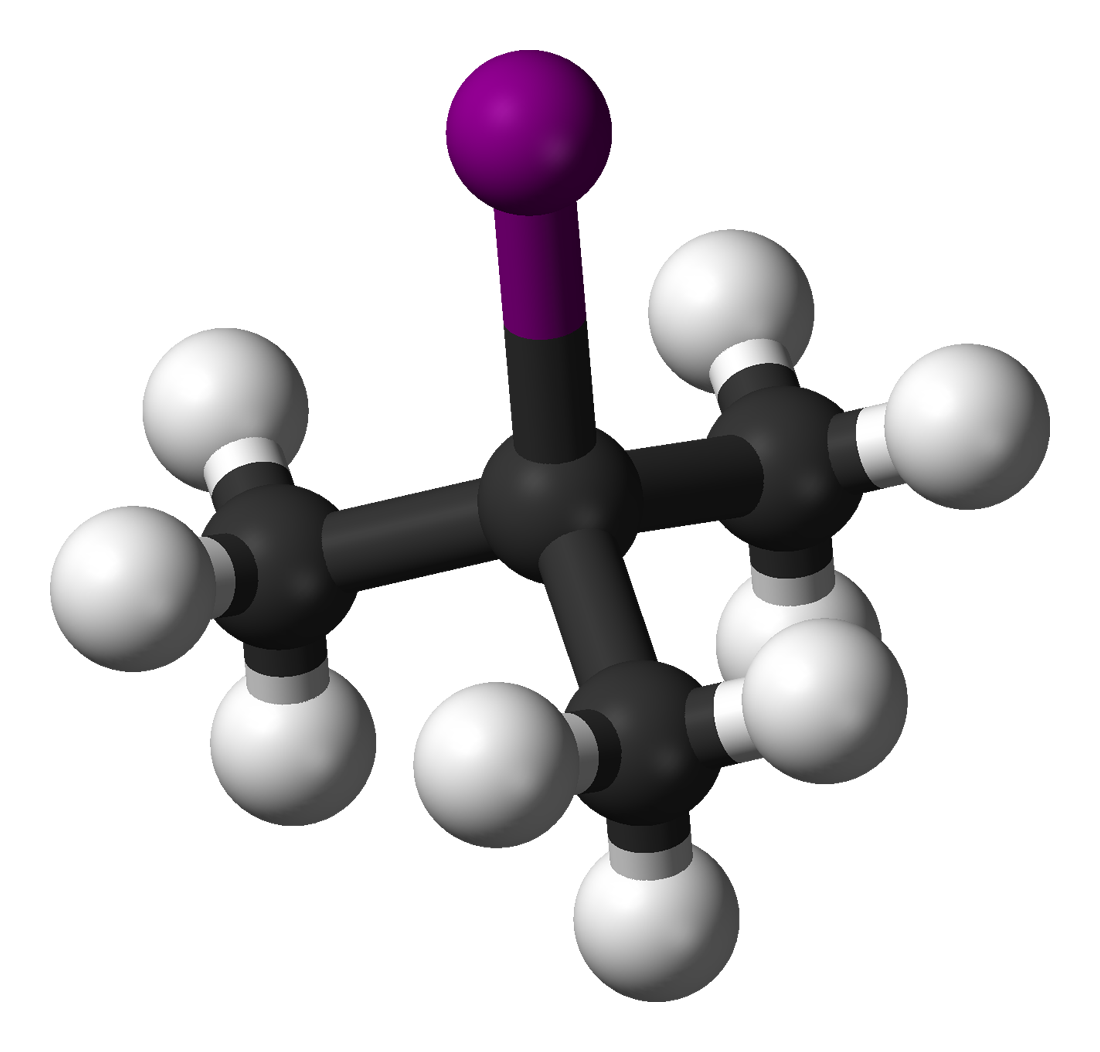

Names
- Systematic IUPAC name 2-Iodo-2-methylpropane

Identifiers
CAS Number	558-17-8
3D model (JSmol)	Interactive image
Abbreviations	Me_{3}CI t-BuI tBuI^{t}BuI
ChemSpider	10733
ECHA InfoCard	100.008.356
EC Number	209-190-1
PubChem CID	11206
UNII	E5HY19G10P
CompTox Dashboard (EPA)	DTXSID3060328
- InChI: InChI=1S/C4H9I/c1-4(2,3)5/h1-3H3 Key: ANGGPYSFTXVERY-UHFFFAOYSA-N
- SMILES: IC(C)(C)C

Properties
Chemical formula	C_{4}H_{9}I
Molar mass	184.020 g·mol^{−1}
Density	1.5445 g·cm^{−3}
Melting point	−38.2 °C (−36.8 °F; 235.0 K)
Boiling point	100.1 °C (212.2 °F; 373.2 K)

Hazards
- GHS labelling
Pictograms	(GHS02: Flammable) (GHS07: Exclamation mark) (GHS09: Environmental hazard)
Signal word	Danger
Hazard statements	H225, H315, H319, H335, H400
Precautionary statements	P210, P233, P240, P241, P242, P243, P261, P264, P264+P265, P271, P273, P280, P302+P352, P303+P361+P353, P304+P340, P305+P351+P338, P319, P321, P332+P317, P337+P317, P362+P364, P370+P378, P391, P403+P233, P403+P235, P405, P501
- Except where otherwise noted, data are given for materials in their standard state (at 25 °C [77 °F], 100 kPa). Infobox references

tert-Butyl iodide (systematic name 2-iodo-2-methylpropane) is an organoiodine compound with the formula Me_{3}CI (Me = methyl). The molecule features a tert-butyl group attached to a iodide substituent.

This chemical is used as a precursor for the tert-butyl radical in various organic chemical reactions. It can also serve as an electrophile in many types of reactions. Examples include for conversion of amino acids to their tert-butyl esters under mild conditions, Heck reactions and electrophilic aromatic substitutions. In combination with DMSO and an additional oxidizing agent such as iodine, it can convert aryl-methyl groups to the corresponding aryl aldehydes. The reaction is postulated to proceed via generation of an intermediate alkoxysulfonium species.
