= 1-Chlorobutane =

- Skeltal formula

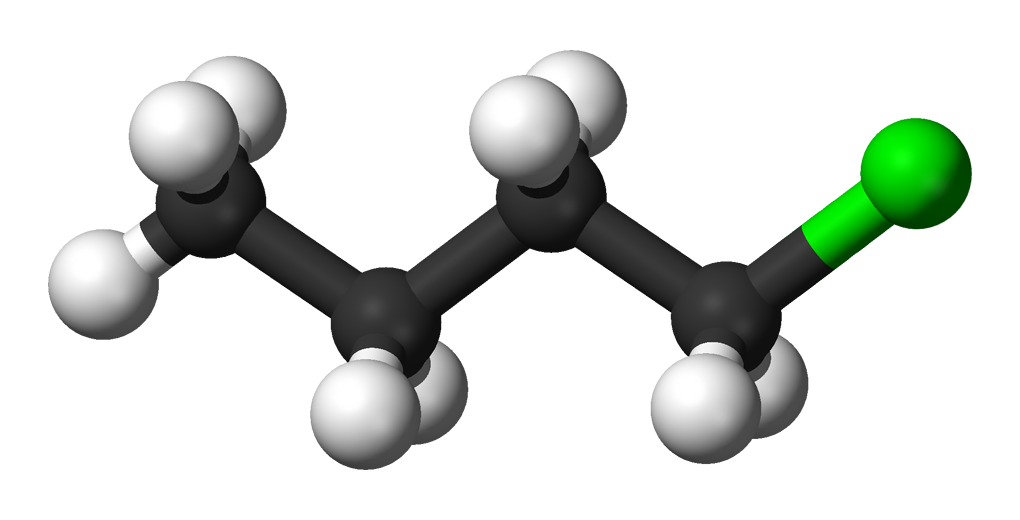
- Ball-and-stick model

Names
- Preferred IUPAC name 1-Chlorobutane
- Other names: n-Butyl chloride; 1-Butyl chloride

Identifiers
CAS Number	109-69-3
3D model (JSmol)	Interactive image
Abbreviations	BuCl n-BuCl nBuCl^{n}BuCl
ChEMBL	ChEMBL47259
ChemSpider	7714
DrugBank	DB11534
ECHA InfoCard	100.003.361
EC Number	203-696-6
PubChem CID	8005
RTECS number	EJ6300000
UNII	ZP7R667SGD
UN number	1127
CompTox Dashboard (EPA)	DTXSID8020206
- InChI: InChI=1S/C4H9Cl/c1-2-3-4-5/h2-4H2,1H3 Key: VFWCMGCRMGJXDK-UHFFFAOYSA-N; InChI=1/C4H9Cl/c1-2-3-4-5/h2-4H2,1H3 Key: VFWCMGCRMGJXDK-UHFFFAOYAR
- SMILES: ClCCCC

Properties
Chemical formula	C_{4}H_{9}Cl
Molar mass	92.57 g·mol^{−1}
Appearance	Colorless liquid
Density	0.89 g/mL
Melting point	−123.1 °C (−189.6 °F; 150.1 K)
Boiling point	78 °C (172 °F; 351 K)
Solubility in water	0.5 g/L (20 °C)
Solubility	Miscible with methanol, ether
log P	2.56
Vapor pressure	103.4±0.1 mmHg at 25 °C
Magnetic susceptibility (χ)	−67.10·10^{−6} cm^{3}/mol
Refractive index (n_{D})	1.396
Viscosity	0.4261 mPa·s

Hazards
- GHS labelling
Pictograms	(GHS02: Flammable)
Signal word	Danger
Hazard statements	H225
Precautionary statements	P210, P233, P240, P241, P242, P243, P280, P303+P361+P353, P370+P378, P403+P235, P501
NFPA 704 (fire diamond)	1 3 1
Flash point	−12 °C (10 °F; 261 K)
Safety data sheet (SDS)	Fischer MSDS
- Except where otherwise noted, data are given for materials in their standard state (at 25 °C [77 °F], 100 kPa). verify (what is ?) Infobox references

1-Chlorobutane is an alkyl halide with the chemical formula C_{4}H_{9}Cl or CH_{3}(CH_{2})_{3}Cl. It is a colorless, flammable liquid. It is used as a solvent in some industries due to its ability to dissolve both polar and non-polar substances. It is an alkylating reagent, that is used in organic synthesis to add a butyl group to other molecules.

== Preparation and reactions ==
It can be prepared from 1-butanol by treatment with hydrogen chloride:

C_{4}H_{9}OH + HCl → C_{4}H_{9}Cl + H_{2}O

It reacts with lithium metal to give n-butyllithium:

2 Li + C_{4}H_{9}Cl → C_{4}H_{9}Li + LiCl

1-Chlorobutane reacts with sodium hydroxide via nucleophilic substitution to produce butanol:

C_{4}H_{9}Cl + NaOH → C_{4}H_{9}OH + NaCl
