= C8H18O2 =

The molecular formula C_{8}H_{18}O_{2} (molar mass: 146.22 g/mol) may refer to:

- Di-tert-butyl peroxide
- 2,2-Diethyl-1,4-butanediol
- Etohexadiol, an ectoparasiticide
- 2-Hexoxyethanol
- MC-2973
- Octanediols
  - 1,2-Octanediol
  - 1,8-Octanediol
