= C9H20O2 =

The molecular formula C_{9}H_{20}O_{2} may refer to:

- Dibutoxymethane
- 1,9-Nonanediol
