= Dry cleaning =

Cleaning of fabrics in non-aqueous solvents

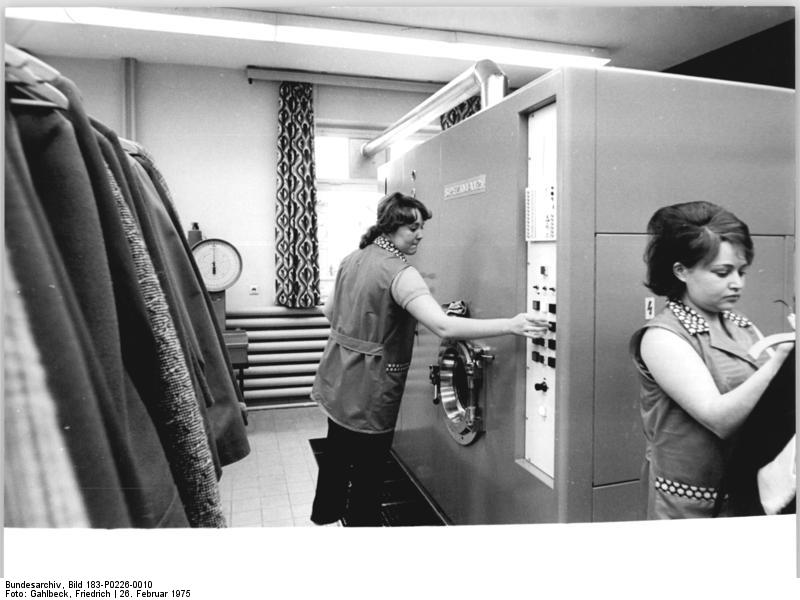
A dry-cleaner in East Germany, 1975

Dry cleaning is any cleaning process for clothing and textiles using a solvent other than water. Clothes are instead soaked in a water-free liquid organic solvent (usually non-polar, as opposed to water which is a polar solvent) typically inside a specialised dry-cleaning machine. The most commonly used solvent is perchloroethylene (known as "PCE" or "perc" for short), although other solvents such as hydrocarbon mixtures and decamethylcyclopentasiloxane are also used. Historical solvents include gasoline, kerosene, benzene, Stoddard solvent, carbon tetrachloride, trichloroethylene, trichlorotrifluoroethane, trichloroethane, and n-propyl bromide.

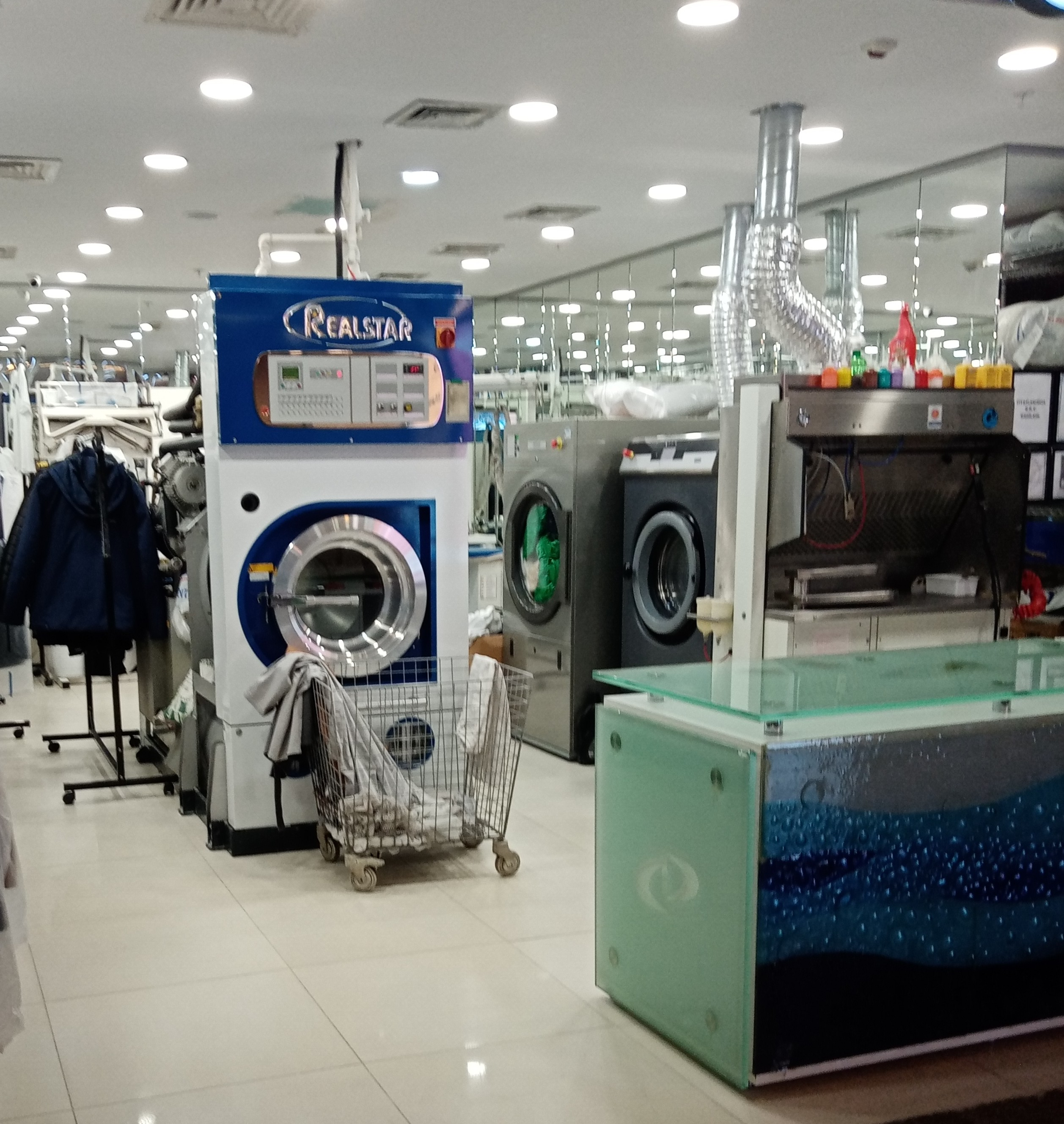
A dry-cleaning shop featuring a dry-cleaning machine, washer/dryers, stain removal station and hung clothes, inside a mall in Turkey, 2025.

Most natural fibers can be washed in water but some synthetics (e.g., viscose) react poorly with water and should be dry cleaned if possible. If not, this could result in changes in texture, colour, strength, and shape. Additionally, certain specialty fabrics, including silk and acetate, may benefit from dry cleaning to prevent damage.

== History ==
In the beginning of the 19th century, French dye-works operator Jean Baptiste Jolly (Note: In some sources incorrectly referred to as "Jolly-Belin") developed his own method using kerosene and gasoline to clean fabrics. He opened the first dry cleaning service in Paris in 1845. Allegedly Jolly got his idea after an accident in 1825, perceiving that his table cloth became cleaner after an oil lamp's content was spilled on it. The oil inside was probably camphine. Over the 1800s, benzene-based compounds were also used as solvents. Early names for commercial dry cleaning were "french cleaning" and "chemical cleaning".

Flammability concerns led William Joseph Stoddard, a dry cleaner from Atlanta, to develop in 1924 Stoddard solvent (white spirit) as a slightly less flammable alternative to gasoline-based solvents. It was the dominant dry-cleaning solvent in the US until the 1950s when perchloroethylene became the dominant solvent.

The use of highly flammable petroleum solvents caused many fires and explosions, resulting in government regulation of dry cleaners. In some jurisdictions it has become necessary to obtain a permit, in order to run a dry cleaner.

=== Shift to chlorinated solvents ===
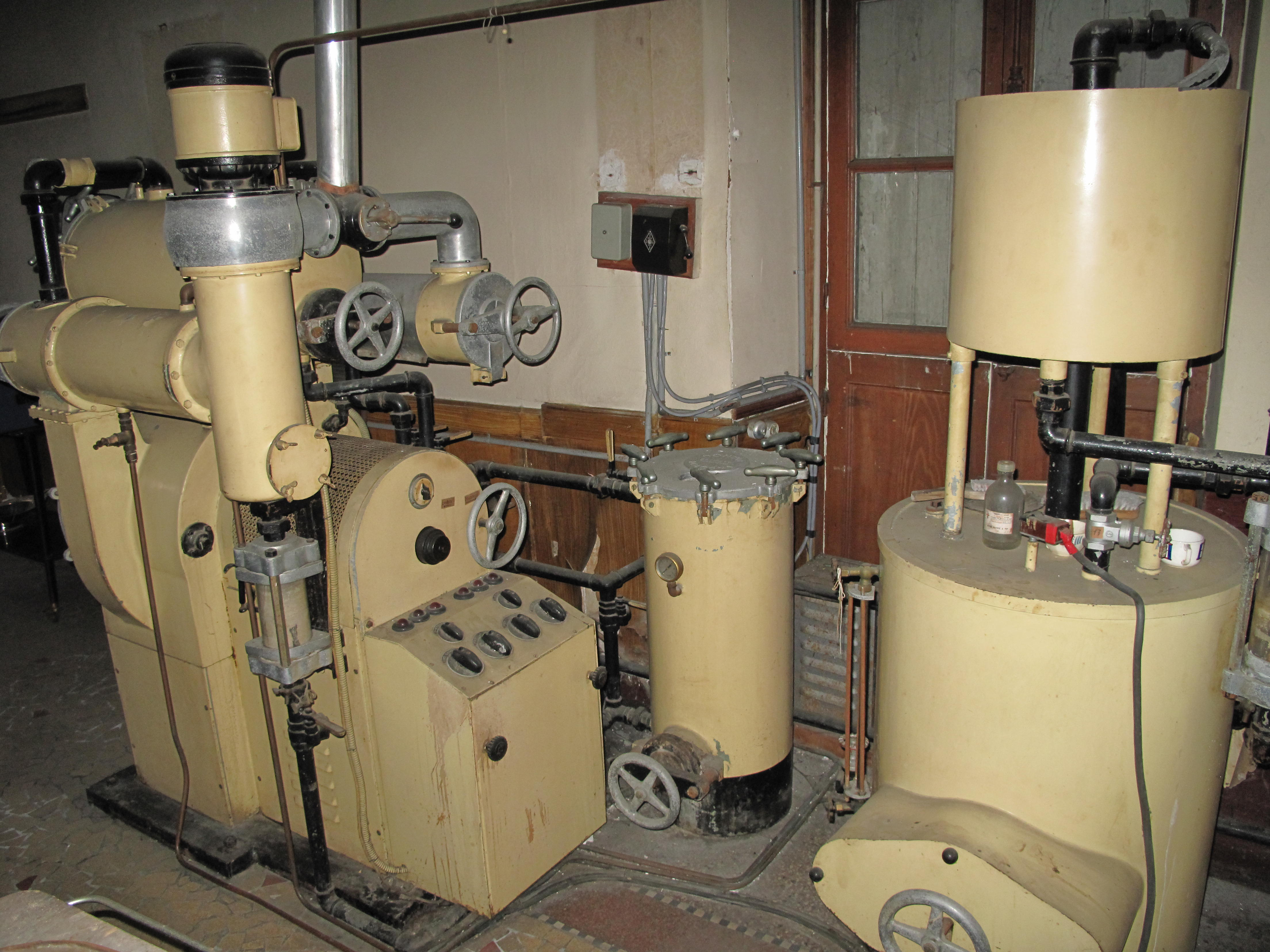
A second generation Italian dry cleaning machine used in France in the 1960s

After World War I, dry cleaners began using chlorinated solvents. These solvents were much less flammable than petroleum solvents and had improved cleaning power. Early solvents were carbon tetrachloride and trichloroethylene (TCE). Carbon tetrachloride was first used as a stain remover in the early 1890s in Germany and later extended to dry-cleaning use by the 1910s. TCE was introduced in United States in 1930, it had the downside of being incompatible with acetate dyes.

In 1930, chemists Sylvia Stoesser, John Grebe, and J. Lawrence Amos of Dow Chemical suggested using perchloroethylene in place of flammable hydrocarbon solvents in dry cleaning, following requests from industry representatives. A washing machine was purchased for the laboratory for research and testing, and all its rubber components were replaced with neoprene, which is resistant to organic solvents. Perchloroethylene's use in dry cleaning was adopted as early as 1933, when it was beginning to be considered the "ideal dry cleaning solvent." In the same year, a dry cleaning machine specifically for use with perchloroethylene and trichloroethylene was developed. By the mid-1930s, the dry cleaning industry had started to adopt perchloroethylene as the main solvent. It has excellent cleaning power and is nonflammable and compatible with most garments. Because it is stable, perchloroethylene is readily recycled by distillation.

== Mechanism and process ==
Structure of cellulose, the main constituent of cotton. The many hydroxyl (-OH) groups bind water, leading to swelling of the fabric and leading to wrinkling, which is minimized when these materials are treated with perchloroethylene or other dry cleaning solvents.

Dry cleaning solvents selectively dissolve stains on the article. The solvents are non-polar and tend to selectively extract many compounds that cause stains. Some of these stains would otherwise only dissolve in aqueous detergent mixtures at high temperatures, potentially damaging delicate fabrics. Non-polar solvents are also good for some fabrics - especially natural fibres - as the solvent does not interact with any polar groups within the fabric. Water binds to these polar groups (hydroxyls in the cellulose for example), resulting in the swelling and stretching of proteins within fibers during laundering. Also, the binding of water molecules interferes with weak attractions within the fiber which results in the loss of the fiber's original shape. After the laundry cycle, water molecules will evaporate. However, the original shape of the fibers has already been distorted and this commonly results in shrinkage. Non-polar solvents prevent this interaction, protecting more delicate fabrics. The usage of an effective solvent coupled with mechanical friction from tumbling effectively removes stains.

A dry cleaning machine is similar to a combination of an industrial washing machine and clothes dryer. Garments are placed in the washing or extraction chamber (referred to as the "basket" or "drum"), which constitutes the core of the machine. The washing chamber contains a horizontal-axis, perforated drum that rotates within an outer shell. The shell holds the solvent while the rotating drum holds the garment load. During the wash cycle, the chamber is filled approximately one-third full of solvent and begins to rotate, agitating the clothing. During the wash cycle, the solvent in the chamber is passed through a filtration column and then fed back into the chamber. The solvent is then removed and sent to a distillation unit consisting of a boiler and condenser. The condensed solvent is fed into a separator unit where any remaining water and water-soluble impurities are separated from the solvent, and the refined solvent is fed into the clean solvent tank. The ideal flow rate is roughly 8 liters of solvent per kilogram of garments per minute (very approximately one gallon per pound of garments), depending on the size of the machine.

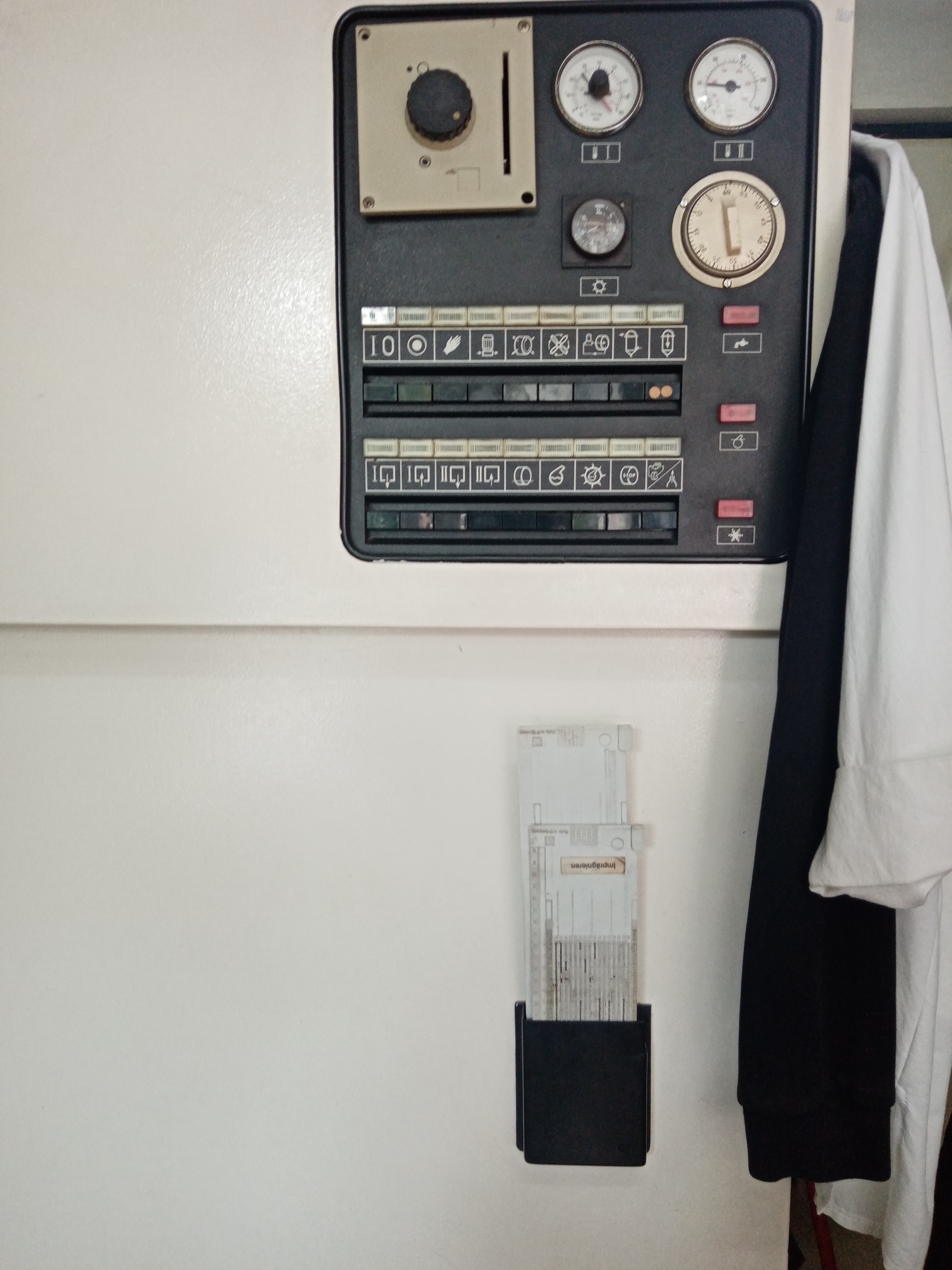
Older dry cleaning machines had analogue control panels and punched cards for cycle programs.

A typical wash cycle lasts for 3–15 minutes depending on the type of garments and degree of soiling. During the first three minutes, solvent-soluble soils dissolve into the perchloroethylene and loose, insoluble soil comes off. It takes 10–12 minutes after the loose soil has come off to remove any ground-in insoluble soil from garments. Machines using hydrocarbon solvents require a wash cycle of at least 25 minutes because of the much slower rate of solvation of solvent-soluble soils. To enhance the solvent's cleaning power, small amounts of special dry-cleaning detergent (0.5–1.25%) may be added to the working solvent. These detergents emulsify hydrophobic soils and keep soil from redepositing on garments. Depending on the machine's design, either an anionic or a cationic detergent is used.

At the end of the wash cycle, the machine starts a rinse cycle where the garment load is rinsed with freshly distilled solvent dispensed from the clean solvent tank. This clean solvent rinse prevents discoloration caused by soil particles being deposited back into the garment from the "dirty" working solvent. After the rinse cycle, the machine begins the extraction process, which recovers the solvent for reuse. Modern machines recover over 90% of the solvent employed. The extraction cycle begins by draining the solvent from the washing chamber and accelerating the basket to 350–450 rpm, causing much of the solvent to spin free of the fabric. Until this time, the cleaning is done at normal temperature, as the solvent is never heated during the dry cleaning process. When no more solvent can be spun out, the machine starts the drying cycle.

During the drying cycle, the garments are tumbled in a stream of warm air (typically around 60–63 °C; 140–145 °F) that circulates throughout the basket, evaporating traces of solvent left after the spin cycle. The air temperature is controlled to prevent heat damage to the garments. The exhausted warm air from the machine then passes through a chiller unit where solvent vapors are condensed and returned to the distilled solvent tank. Modern dry cleaning machines use a closed-loop system in which the chilled air is reheated and recirculated. This results in high solvent recovery rates and reduced air pollution. In the early days of dry cleaning, large amounts of solvent vapors were vented to the atmosphere via exhausts because it was regarded as cheap and believed to be harmless. After the drying cycle is complete, a deodorizing (aeration) cycle cools the garments and removes further traces of solvent by circulating cool outside air over the garments and then through a vapor recovery filter made from activated carbon and polymer resins. After the aeration cycle, the garments are clean and ready for pressing and finishing.

Not all stains can be removed by dry cleaning. Some need to be treated with spotting solvents – sometimes by steam jet or by soaking in special stain-remover liquids – before garments are washed or dry cleaned. Also, garments which have been stored in soiled condition for a long time are difficult to bring back to their original color and texture, since irreversible chemical reactions (such as oxidation) may occur over time.

=== Machinery ===
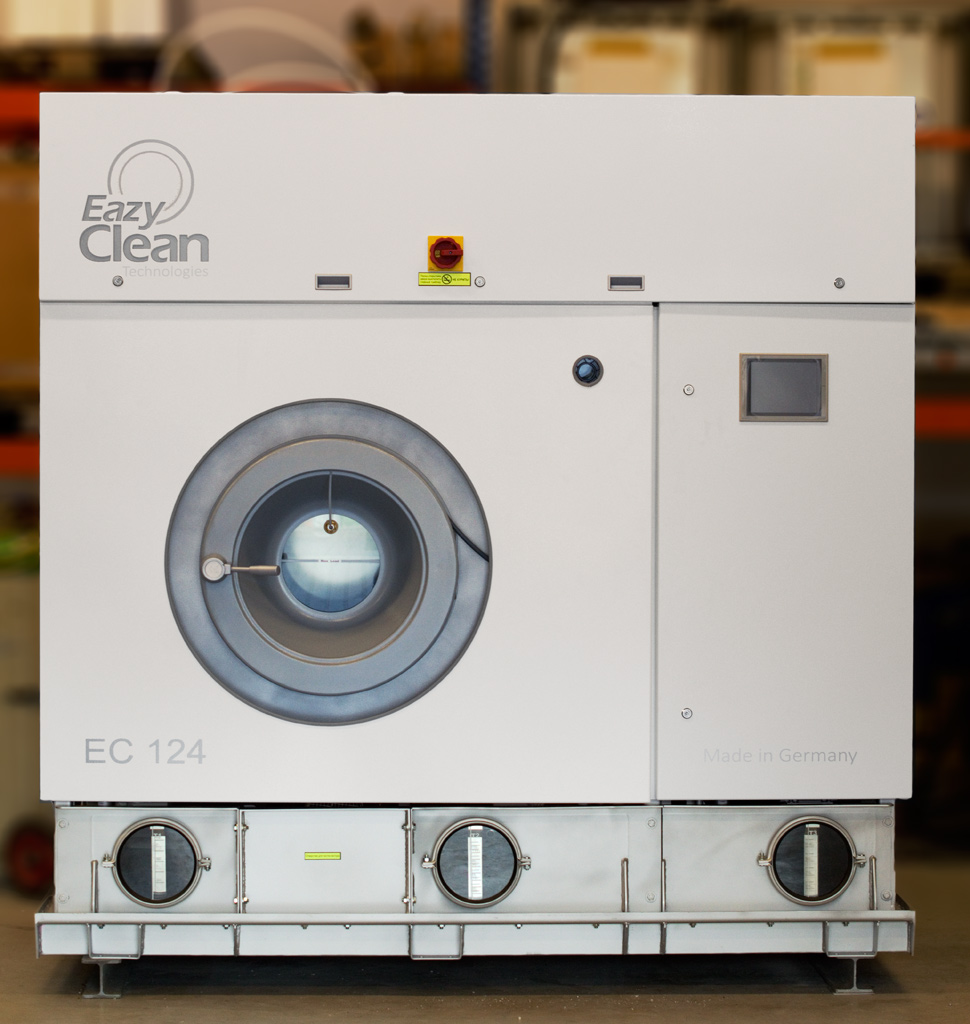
A modern multisolvent dry cleaning machine with touchscreen and PLC control, designed for use with hydrocarbon mixtures and D5. Manufacturer: EazyClean, model EC124. Photo taken prior to installation.

Dry-cleaning machines are classified into several generations:

- First generation machines consisted of two separate units, used until the late 1960s. One unit was solely for the washing and other one was for drying, dry-cleaned clothes would be manually taken to the dryer unit by the operator. Machines of this era were described as "vented"; their drying exhausts were expelled into the atmosphere, the same as many modern tumble-dryer exhausts. This contributed to environmental contamination, and much potentially reusable solvent was lost to the atmosphere.
- Second generation machines combined both washer and dryer functions, still vented vapours outside. Such machines are still called "dry-to-dry".
- Third generation machines (late 1970s to early 1980s) included mechanisms to reduce vapour emissions and recover the solvent.
- Fourth generation machines included internal vapour recycling by capturing solvent vapours from the air inside the machine, often having carbon filters to clean used solvent. These machines were almost fully close-circuit. In enclosed machines, solvent extracted during the drying process is recovered and purified by distillation, so it can be reused to clean further loads or safely disposed of. Most modern enclosed machines also incorporate a computer-controlled drying sensor, which automatically senses when all detectable traces of PCE have been removed. This system ensures that only small amounts of PCE fumes are released at the end of the cycle.
- Fifth generation machines added special sensors to capture higher concentrations of solvent in the air. This generation of machines have automatic locks on the lid to prevent opening unless the solvent inside the chamber has been reduced to below 300 parts per million concentration in the air inside.

=== Infrastructure ===
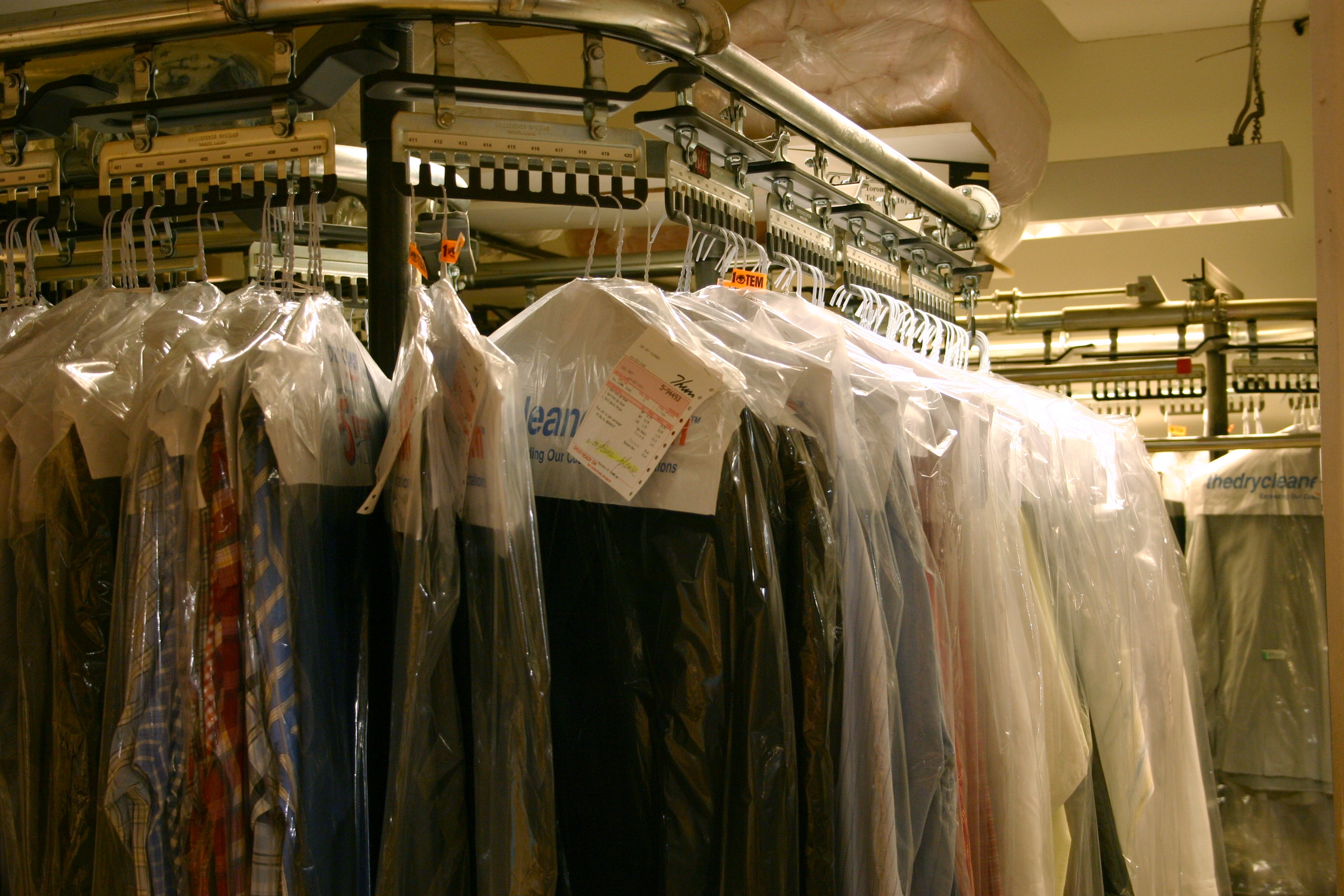
Many dry cleaners place cleaned clothes inside thin clear plastic garment bags.

From the customer's perspective, dry cleaning businesses are either "plants" or "drop shops". The former does on-site cleaning, while a drop shop receives garments from customers, sends them to a large plant, and then has the cleaned garments returned to the shop for pickup by the customer. The latter setup minimized the risk of fire or dangerous fumes created by the cleaning process. An older dry-cleaning setup was the "coin-op" machines which were operated by the customers themselves. Coin-op machines were mostly seen in North America and went into decline in late 20th century.

== Main solvents ==
It is estimated that 50% to 70% of dry cleaners in the US were using PCE as of 2012. Alternative solvents are available, but these may require major changes in equipment, procedures, and operator training. Flammable solvents may require installation of expensive fire-suppression systems. Because PCE has been the longtime de facto solvent for dry cleaning, there is considerable interest in finding a "drop-in" substitute solvent which could be used with minimal changes to existing equipment and procedures.

=== Perchloroethylene ===
Chemical structure of perchloroethylene

Perchloroethylene (C_{2}Cl_{4}; PCE or perc, tetrachloroethylene) is the main solvent in dry cleaning and it has been in use since the 1930s. PCE is the most common solvent, the standard for cleaning performance. It is a highly effective cleaning solvent with a KB-value of 90, and it is thermally stable, nonflammable, recyclable, and has very low toxicity and a pleasant smell. PCE is recycled by distillation at its boiling point (121 °C). Unlike the related dry-cleaning solvent carbon tetrachloride, perchloroethylene is not an ozone-depleting substance. Perchloroethylene can cause color bleeding/loss, especially at higher temperatures. In some cases it may damage special trims, buttons and beads on some garments. It is better for oil-based stains than more common water-soluble stains. It does not leave smell on dry-cleaned clothes. A dry cleaning machine running on perchloroethylene is called a "perc machine".

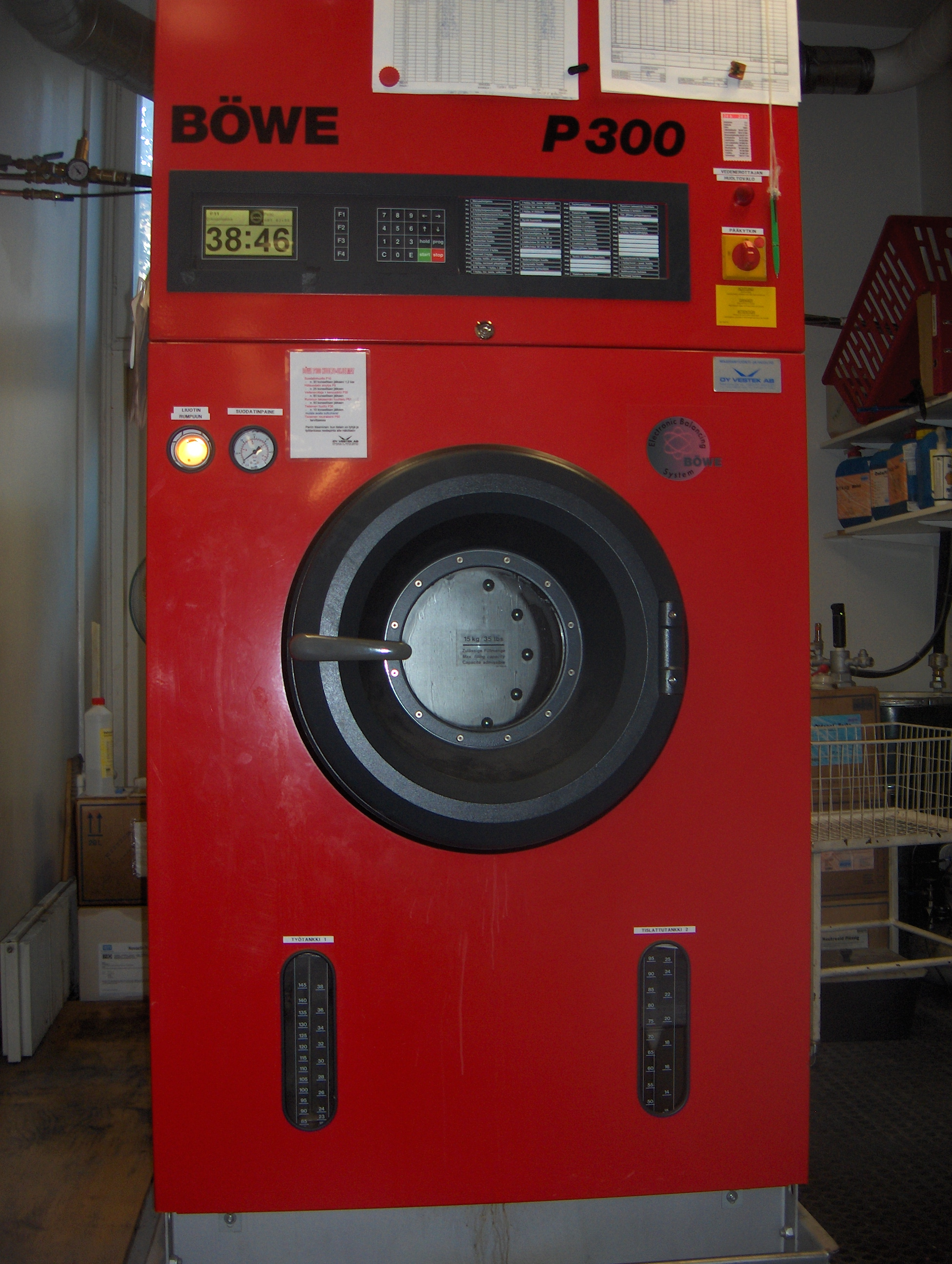
P300 model dry cleaning machine with PLC control designed for use with perchloroethylene. Manufactured by BÖWE Textile Cleaning; Germany.

Inhalation of high concentrations of perchloroethylene can produce narcotic and hallucinogenic effects, thus perchloroethylene is regarded as a mild neurotoxin and these effects are completely reversible upon the cessation of exposure. The toxicity of perchloroethylene is moderate to low and reports of human injury are uncommon despite its wide usage in dry cleaning and degreasing. Perchloroethylene is classified as "probably carcinogenic to humans" (Group 2A, same classification as red meat and hot beverages) by the International Agency for Research on Cancer (IARC). There is a suspicion that it is carcinogenic to humans in long term, but the evidence is limited since most of the evaluated dry-cleaners had heavy smoking and drinking habits which are known carcinogens and were exposed to many other chemicals at the workplace. A study published in 2011 investigated cancer rates among dry cleaners exposed to perchloroethylene for many years and laundry workers who were not exposed to perchloroethylene as the control group, based on a total of more than nine thousand people, found no difference in the cancer rates between the two groups: there was no significant increase in the incidence of esophageal, cervical, liver, kidney and bladder cancers, which were previously suspected to be caused by perchloroethylene. The exposure to perchloroethylene in a typical dry cleaner is considered far below the levels required to cause any risk.

=== Hydrocarbons ===
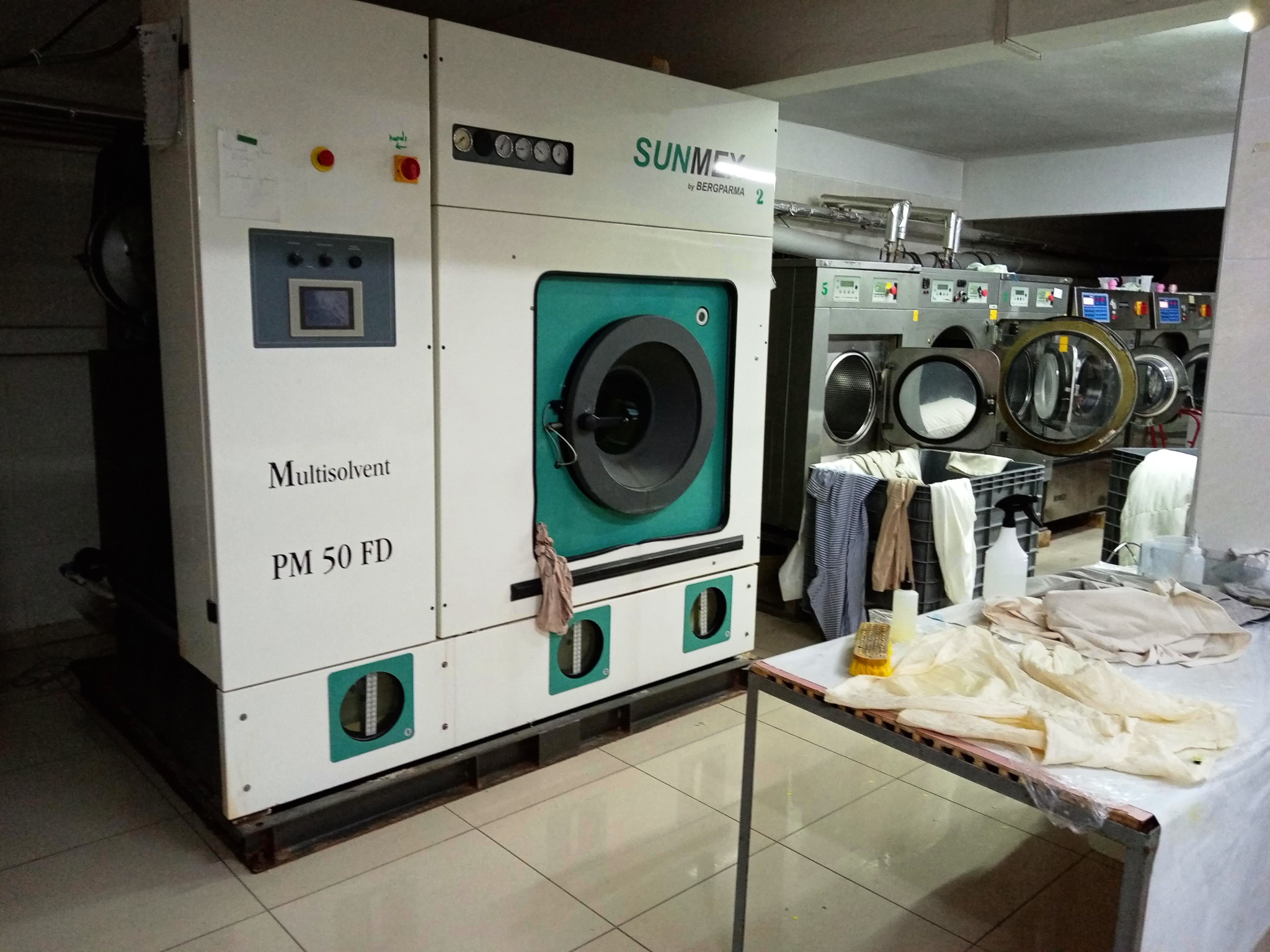
A multisolvent dry-cleaning machine mainly designed for use with hydrocarbons, dibutoxymethane, propylene glycol ethers and siloxanes by the Italian company Bergparma. Unit pictured was modified to work with perchloroethylene.

Hydrocarbon mixtures have KB values between 27–45. Hydrocarbons have been used in dry cleaning since the early years (19th century). Early hydrocarbon solvents used were kerosene and the less flammable Stoddard solvent (also called "white spirit"), which is a mixture of over 65% C_{10} or higher hydrocarbons, has a relatively low flash point of 38 °C (100 °F). High flash hydrocarbons, characterized as having a flash point higher than 60 °C (140 °F), are considered to be safer than traditional hydrocarbon solvents. Examples include Exxon-Mobil's DF-2000 or Chevron Phillips' EcoSolv, and PureDry. These petroleum-based solvents are less aggressive but also less effective than PCE. Although hydrocarbons are combustible, the risk of fire or explosion can be minimized when they are used properly; a fire-suppression system may also be required. Hydrocarbons are considered to be volatile organic (VOC) pollutants. Hydrocarbon dry cleaning machines have a high risk of bacterial growth in presence of moisture and bacterial breakdown products can lead to lingering foul odors inside the machines and on cleaned garments.

"PureDry" was a solvent mixture marketed as an alternative for PCE in 2000. It contained 95% C_{9}-C_{12} isoparaffinic hydrocarbons, with the rest being hydrofluoroethers, and perfluoroisobutylethers (a type of PFAS).

=== Decamethylcyclopentasiloxane ===
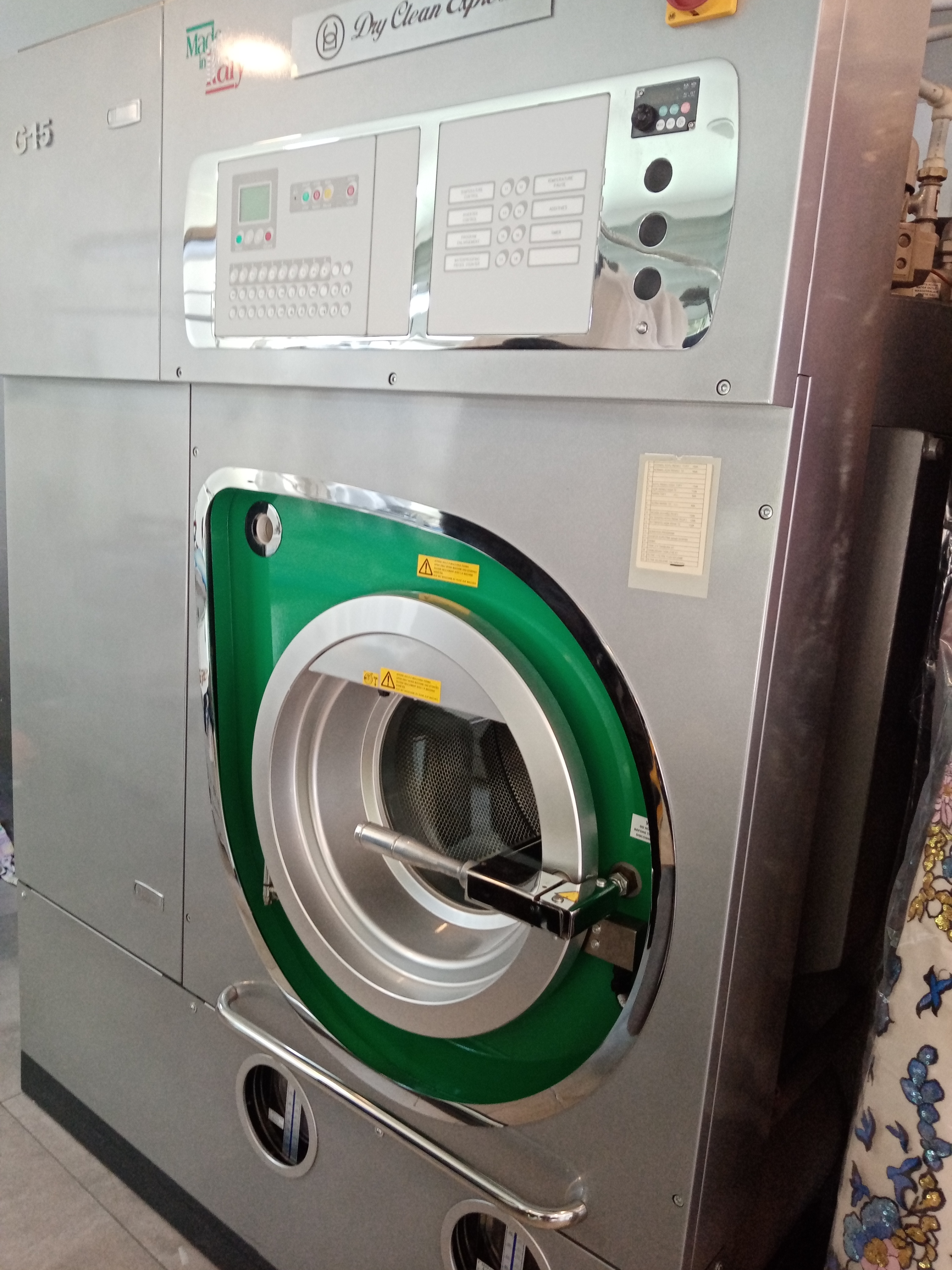
An Italian dry cleaning machine for decamethylcyclopentasiloxane used in Turkey in the 2020s. It uses various filters to clean used solvent.

Decamethylcyclopentasiloxane (C_{10}H_{30}Si_{5}O_{5}; colloquially known as "siloxane" or "liquid silicone", trademarked Siloxane D5), was initially popularized by GreenEarth Cleaning in the late 1990s. It is more expensive than PCE (chemical and machinery-wise) and requires a GreenEarth licence to be used by dry-cleaners. It is insufficient in dissolving oils and grease, compared to other dry-cleaning solvents. It has the lowest KB value (13) among all dry-cleaning solvents. It is less aggressive than PCE and can be used to clean more delicate garments. Dry-cleaning machines for decamethylcyclopentasiloxane recycle the solvent by extensive filtration, unlike most other dry-cleaning systems for PCE, hydrocarbons and some other solvents.

It is marketed as an eco-friendly product that degrades quickly in the environment, but is controlled in the European Union due to its persistent, bioaccumulative and toxic characteristics. It does not degrade in nature, it is highly toxic to the aquatic life and has higher bioaccumulative properties than perchloroethylene. Its use in dry cleaning will be prohibited in the European Union after June 2026 due to its environmental effect.

=== Other solvents: niche and emerging ===
For decades, efforts have been made to replace PCE. These alternatives have not proven popular thus far:

- Glycol ethers (also called "propylene glycol ethers") are a class of organic solvents including dipropylene glycol tert-butyl ether (DPtB), dipropylene glycol n-butyl ether (DPnB), and propylene glycol t-butyl ether (PGtBE) which were introduced in the 1990s as an alternative to PCE. These solvent mixes are flammable, but are considered comparable to high-flash hydrocarbons in fire hazard. They have relatively benign persistence and environmental effects.
- Dibutoxymethane (C_{9}H_{20}O_{2};formaldehyde dibutyl acetal, also referred to as "butylal" or loosely as "acetal", and trademarked as "SolvonK4") is a bipolar solvent that removes water- and oil-based stains. Because the solvent is relatively new in cleaning applications, there has been relatively little specific research into health and environmental effects.

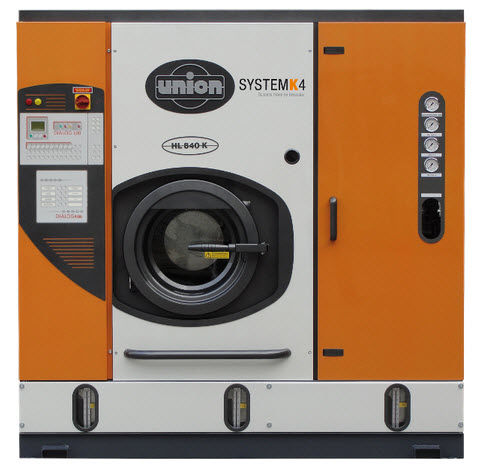
A modern dry cleaning machine by Union for use with SolvonK4 (dibutoxymethane).

- Brominated solvents (such as n-propyl bromide, Fabrisolv, DrySolv) are solvents with higher KB-values than PCE (n-propyl bromide has a KB value of 129, compared to 90 of PCE). This allows faster cleaning, but can damage some synthetic beads and sequins if not used correctly. Machines used with n-propyl bromide were converted PCE machines. Converted PCE machines often had parts incompatible with nPB which lead to leaks and increased worker exposure to nPB.

Healthwise, there are reported risks associated with nPB such as permanent numbness of nerves. Environmentally, it is approved by the US EPA. It is among the more expensive solvents, but it has advantages of faster cleaning, lower temperatures, and quick drying times. In 2016, the state of Massachusetts listed the solvent as a "Higher Hazard Substance" due to increased concerns about its health and environmental effects.

- Liquid or supercritical CO_{2} is a suggested alternative solvent; however, it is inferior to perchloroethylene and hydrocarbons in removing some forms of grime. Additive surfactants improve the efficacy of CO_{2}. Machinery for use of CO_{2} is expensive – up to $90,000 more than a PCE machine, making affordability difficult for small businesses. Some cleaners with these machines keep traditional machines on-site for more-heavily soiled textiles, but others find plant-derived enzymes to be equally effective and more environmentally sustainable. Carbon dioxide is almost entirely nontoxic (but is an asphyxiant risk in high concentrations). The CO_{2} dry cleaning process involves charging a sealed chamber which has been loaded with clothes, using gaseous carbon dioxide from a storage vessel to approximately 200 to 300 psi (14 to 21 bar) of pressure. This step in the process is initiated as a precaution to avoid thermal shock to the cleaning chamber. Liquid carbon dioxide is then pumped into the cleaning chamber from a separate storage vessel by a hydraulic or electrically driven pump. The pump increases the pressure of the liquid carbon dioxide to approximately 900 to 1,500 psi (62 to 103 bar). A separate sub-cooler reduces the temperature of the carbon dioxide by 2 to 3 °C (3.6 to 5.4 °F) below the boiling point, in an effort to prevent cavitation which could lead to premature degradation of the pump.

Consumer Reports rated CO_{2} "superior to conventional methods", but the Drycleaning and Laundry Institute commented on its "fairly low cleaning ability" in a 2007 report. CO_{2} is a mild solvent overall, which lowers its ability to aggressively attack stains. One deficiency with CO_{2} is its low electrical conductivity. When solvent interacts with the fabric's surface, the friction dislocates dirt. At the same time, the friction also builds up an electrical charge. Fabrics are very poor conductors, but usually this build-up of static electricity is dissipated through the solvent. This discharge does not occur in liquid carbon dioxide, and the build-up of an electrical charge on the surface of the fabric attracts the dirt back on to the surface, diminishing the cleaning efficiency. To compensate for the poor solubility and conductivity of supercritical carbon dioxide, research has focused on additives. For increased solubility, 2-propanol has shown increased cleaning effects for liquid carbon dioxide, as it increases the ability of the solvent to dissolve polar compounds.

=== Obsolete solvents ===
- Trichloroethylene (TCE) is more aggressive (KB value: 129) than the chemically related PCE and 1,1,1-trichloroethane. It is no longer used as a main solvent in dry cleaning but it is still used as a stain remover by dry cleaners today. With superior degreasing properties, it was often used for industrial workwear/overalls cleaning in the past. It had a tendency to dissolve acetate dyes. Trichloroethylene was introduced in 1930 but it was mostly replaced by PCE in the 1950s. Most common health hazard of TCE is its anaesthetic effects. TCE is a human carcinogen (classified as such by International Agency for Research on Cancer and United States Environmental Protection Agency), albeit a weak one.
- Carbon tetrachloride (CCl_{4}) was once widely used in dry cleaning as the first chlorinated solvent, as a non-flammable alternative to highly flammable hydrocarbon solvents and it was used until the 1950s. It was one of strongest (KB value: 136) among the many solvents used in dry-cleaning. It tended to hydrolyze in presence of humidity to form acidic compounds that corroded machinery used in dry cleaning. Its use was abandoned after its high hepatotoxicity was discovered.
- 1,1,1-Trichloroethane (methylchloroform, chlorothene) was also used in dry cleaning, until its use was banned due to its harmful effects on the ozone layer.
- CFC-113 (Freon-113, Valclene, Arklone), a Chlorofluorocarbon, is now banned for being a ozone-depleting substance. It has a KB value of 30. It was introduced to dry cleaning in 1961 by DuPont. In 1986, 489 dry-cleaning facilities in the US (about 2.2% of 21,787 dry-cleaning facilities) were using CFC-113 as their main solvent.

== Solvent reprocessing ==
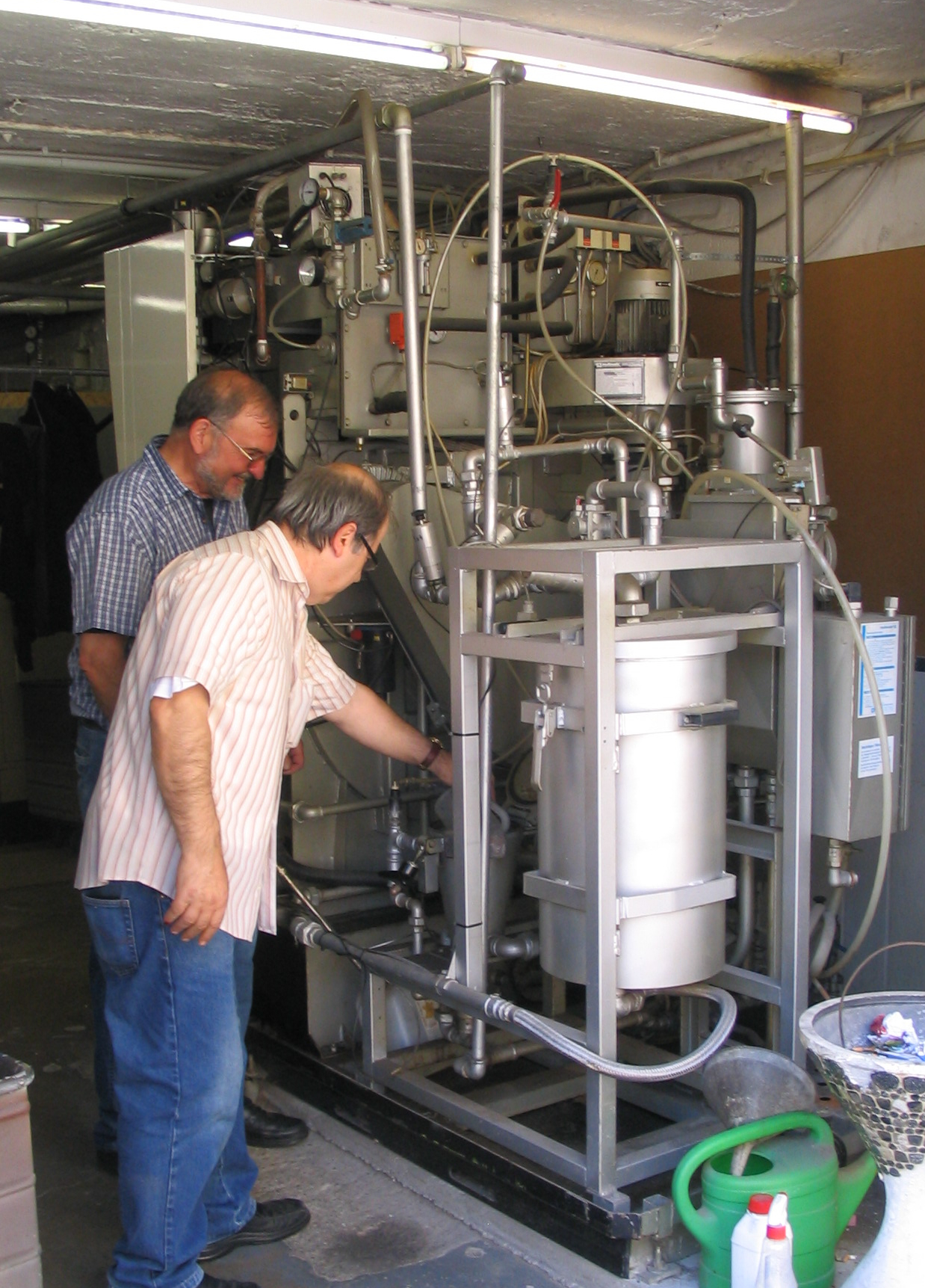
Solvent reprocessing machinery (Germany)

Working solvent from the washing chamber passes through several filtration steps before it is returned to the washing chamber. The first step is a button trap, which prevents small objects such as lint, fasteners, buttons, and coins from entering the solvent pump. After the lint filter, the solvent passes through an absorptive cartridge filter. This filter, which contains activated clays and activated charcoal, removes fine insoluble soil residues, non-volatile residues, and dyes from the solvent. Finally, the solvent passes through a polishing filter, which removes any contaminants not previously removed. The clean solvent is then returned to the working solvent tank.

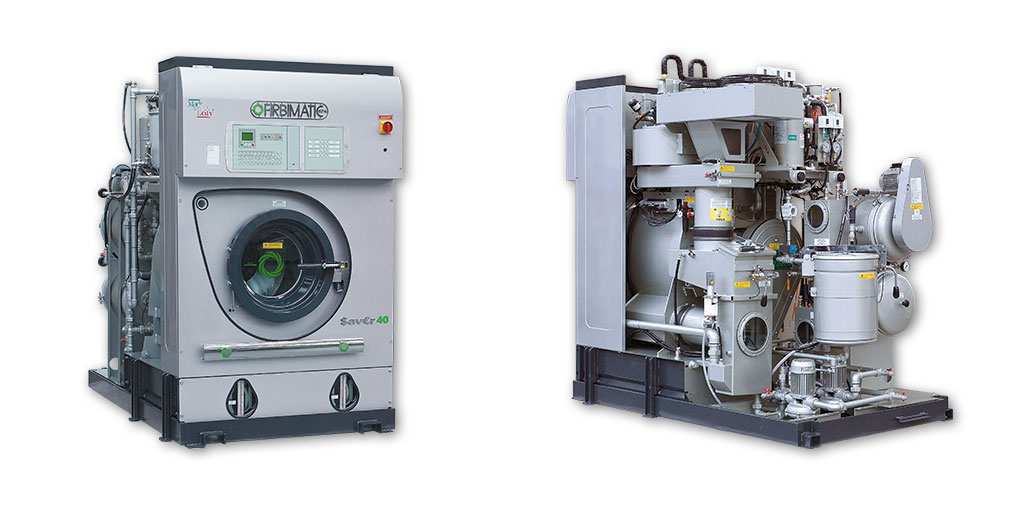
A Firbimatic Saver Series dry cleaning machine for nonaliphatic (cyclic) solvents. This machine uses activated clay filtration instead of distillation. It uses much less energy than conventional methods.

Over time, a thin layer of filter cake (called "muck") accumulates on the lint filter. The muck is removed regularly (commonly once per day) and then processed to recover solvent trapped in the muck. Many machines use "spin disk filters", which remove the muck from the filter by centrifugal force while it is back washed with solvent. "Cooked powder residue" is the name for the waste material generated by cooking down or distilling muck. It will contain residual solvent, powdered filter material (diatomite), carbon, non-volatile residues, lint, dyes, grease, soils, and water. The waste sludge or solid residue from the still contains residual solvent, water, soils, carbon, and other non-volatile residues. Used filters are another form of waste, as is waste water, which are also subject to regulation by local environmental authorities (such as Environmental Protection Agency in the United States).

== Garment compatibility ==
Garments should be carefully checked for foreign objects before being placed in the machine. Depending on the solvent used, items such as plastic pens may dissolve in the solvent bath, damaging the entire batch of textiles, certain textile dyes are "loose" and will shed dye during solvent immersion.

Fragile items, such as feather bedspreads or tasseled rugs or hangings, may be protected by enclosing them in a loose mesh bag. The density of perchloroethylene is around 1.62 g/cm^{3} at room temperature (62% heavier than water), and the sheer weight of absorbed solvent may cause the textile to fail under typical forces during the spin extraction cycle, unless the mesh bag provides mechanical support.

=== Care symbols ===
The international GINETEX laundry symbol for dry cleaning is a circle. It may have the letter "P" inside it to indicate perchloroethylene solvent, or the letter "F" to indicate a flammable solvent (German: Feuergefährliches Schwerbenzin). A bar underneath the circle indicates that only mild cleaning processes are recommended. A crossed-out empty circle indicates that an item should not be dry cleaned at all.

Professional cleaning symbol

Dry clean, perchloroethylene (PCE) only

Gentle cleaning with PCE

Very gentle cleaning with PCE

Dry clean, hydrocarbon solvent only (HCS)

Gentle cleaning with hydrocarbon solvents

Very gentle cleaning with hydrocarbon solvents

Do not dry clean

== See also ==
- Fabric restoration
- List of laundry topics
- Wet cleaning
