= C11H14O4 =

Molecular formula

The molecular formula C_{11}H_{14}O_{4} (molar mass: 210.22 g/mol, exact mass: 210.0892 u) may refer to:

- Dimethyl carbate
- Sinapyl alcohol
