= Octanediol =

Octanediol may refer to:

- 1,2-Octanediol, also known as caprylyl glycol
- 1,8-Octanediol, also known as octamethylene glycol
