= C7H16O2 =

The molecular formula C_{7}H_{16}O_{2} (molar mass: 132.203 g/mol) may refer to:

- Prenderol
- 2-Methyl-2-propyl-1,3-propanediol
