= Laundry symbol =

Pictograms providing clothing care recommendations

Laundry symbols logo by GINETEX

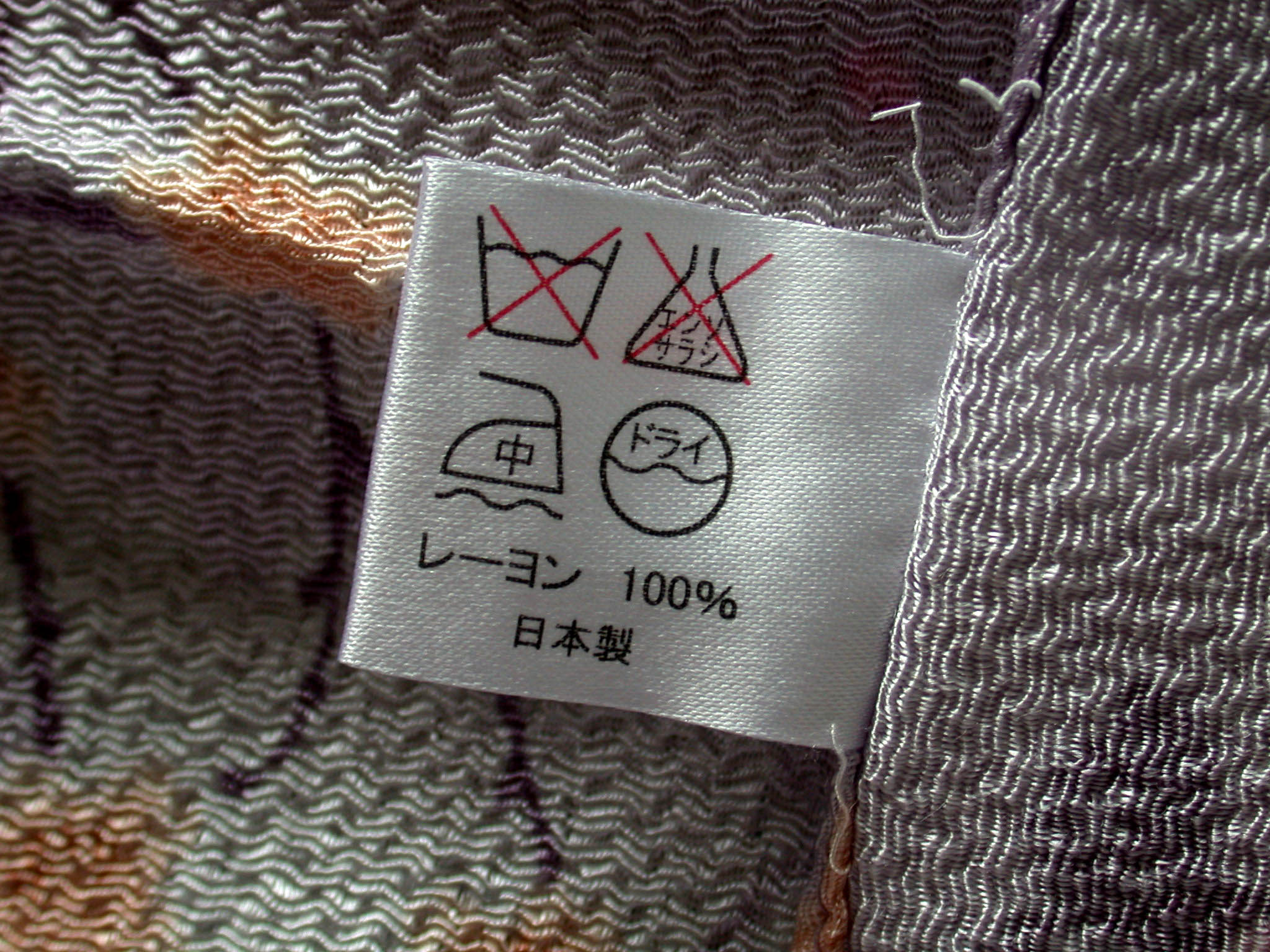
Laundry care symbols with instructions in Japanese. The four symbols shown indicate that the garment must not be washed in water, must not be bleached, may be ironed only with a protective pressing cloth, and must be dry cleaned.

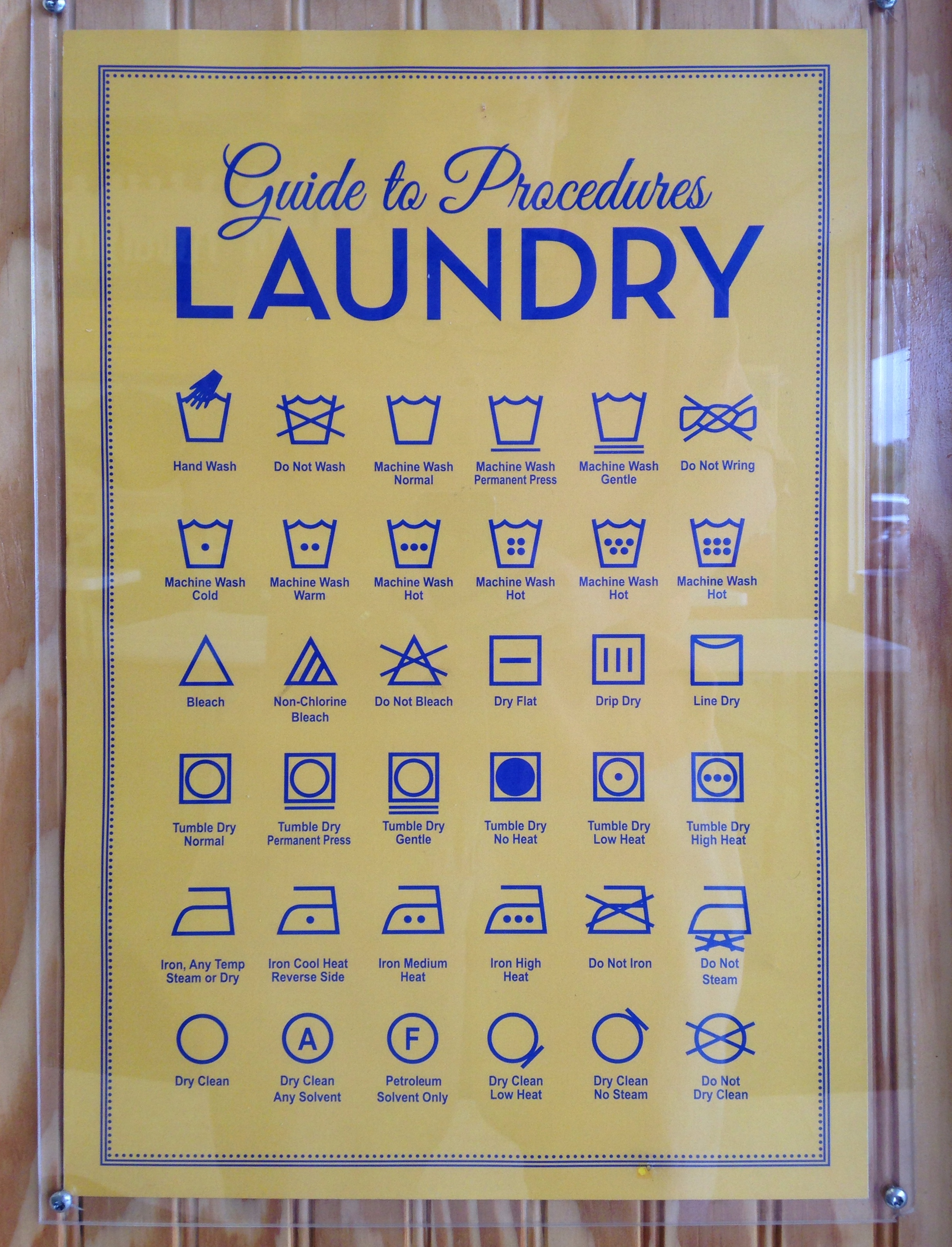
A poster from a laundromat in Beckley, West Virginia, that lists many of the common laundering instruction icons found on garment tags

A laundry symbol, also called a care symbol, is a pictogram indicating the manufacturer's suggestions as to methods of washing, drying, dry-cleaning and ironing clothing. Such symbols are written on labels, known as care labels or care tags, attached to clothing to indicate how a particular item should best be cleaned. While there are internationally recognized standards for the care labels and pictograms, their exact use and form differ by region. In some standards, pictograms coexist with or are complemented by written instructions.

== Standards ==
GINETEX, the France-based European association for textile care labelling, was formed in 1963 in part to define international standards for the care and labelling of textiles. By the early 1970s, GINETEX was working with ISO to develop international standards for textile labelling, eventually leading to the ISO 3758 standard, Textiles – Care labelling code using symbols. ISO 3758 was supplemented in 1993, revised in 2005 and again in 2012 and 2023 with reviews of the standard held on a five-year cycle.

In March 1970, the Canadian Government Specifications Board published 86-GP-1, Standard for Care Labelling of Textiles, which promoted a symbol-based textile care labelling system in which symbols were colored: green indicated "no precautions are necessary", yellow indicated "some caution is necessary", and red indicated "prohibited". Publication 86-GP-1 was revised several times over the following three decades; the most noteworthy change was in 1979, when temperatures changed from Fahrenheit to Celsius, and any additional instructions were to be added in text, in both English and French. In 2003, the system was withdrawn in favor of a black-and-white symbol-based system harmonized with North American and international standards. The inclusion of care symbols on garments made or sold in Canada has always been voluntary; only fabric content labels are mandatory (since 1972).

In 1996, in the United States, ASTM International published a system of pictorial care instructions as D5489 Standard Guide for Care Symbols for Care Instructions on Textile Products, with revisions in 1998, 2001, 2007, 2014, and 2018.

American Cleaning institute developed and published their guide to fabric care symbols.

Additional textile care labelling systems have been developed for Australia, China, and Japan. Worldwide, all of these systems tend to use similar pictograms or labelling to convey laundry care instructions. As of 2021, the pictograms are not encoded in Unicode standards, because these symbols are not in the public domain across various countries, and are copyrighted.

== Pictograms ==
=== General ===
The care label describes the allowable treatment of the garment without damaging the textile. Whether this treatment is necessary or sufficient, is not stated. A milder than specified treatment is always acceptable. The symbols are protected and their use is required to comply with the license conditions; incorrect labelling is prohibited. A bar below each symbol calls for a gentler treatment than usual and a double bar for a very gentle treatment.

=== Washing ===
A stylized washing machine is shown. In international standards, the number in the tub means the maximum wash temperature (degrees Celsius). In the North American standard, dots are used instead of numbers, where more dots indicating hotter temperatures.

In the European standard, the level of wash agitation recommended is indicated by bars below the wash tub symbol. Absence of bar indicates a maximum agitation (cotton wash), a single bar indicates medium agitation (synthetics cycle), and a double bar indicates very minimal agitation (silk/wool cycle). A hand in the tub signifies that only (gentle) hand washing (not above 40 °C) is allowed. A cross through washtub means that the textile may not be washed under normal household conditions.

Washing symbol

Wash at or below 30 °C (86 °F) (US, 1 dot, ●)

Wash at or below 40 °C (104 °F) (US, 2 dots, ●●)

Wash at or below 50 °C (122 °F) (US, 3 dots, ●●●)

Wash at or below 60 °C (140 °F) (US, 4 dots, ●●●●)

Wash at or below 30 °C (86 °F), medium agitation

Wash at or below 30 °C (86 °F), gentle agitation

Hand wash

Do not wash

=== Bleaching ===
An empty triangle (formerly lettered Cl) allows the bleaching with chlorine or non-chlorine bleach. Two oblique lines in the triangle prohibit chlorine bleaching. A crossed triangle prohibits any bleaching.

Bleaching symbol (allowed for both chlorine and non-chlorine bleach)

Bleaching with chlorine allowed (obsolete)

Non-chlorine bleach when needed

Do not bleach

Do not bleach

=== Drying ===
A circle in the square symbolizes a clothes dryer. One dot requires drying at reduced temperature and two dots for normal temperature. The crossed symbol means that the clothing does not tolerate machine drying. In the US and Japan, there are other icons for natural/line drying.

==== Tumble drying ====
Tumble drying symbol

Tumble drying (low temperature)

Tumble drying (normal)

Do not tumble dry

==== Natural drying ====
Drying symbol

Line dry

Dry flat

Drip dry

Dry in the shade

Line dry in the shade

Dry flat in shade

Drip dry in shade

=== Ironing ===
The iron with up to three dots allows for ironing. The number of dots are assigned temperatures: one prescribes 110 °C (230 °F), two for 150 °C (302 °F) and three for 200 °C (392 °F). An iron with a cross prohibits ironing.

Ironing symbol

Iron at low temperature

Iron at medium temperature

Iron at high temperature

Do not iron

=== Professional cleaning ===
A circle identifies the possibilities of professional cleaning. A bar under the symbol means clean gently, and two bars means very gentle cleaning.

==== Dry cleaning ====
The letters P and F in a circle are for the different solvents used in professional dry cleaning.

Professional cleaning symbol

Dry clean, hydrocarbon solvent only (HCS)

Gentle cleaning with hydrocarbon solvents

Very gentle cleaning with hydrocarbon solvents

Dry clean, tetrachloroethylene (PCE) only

Gentle cleaning with PCE

Very gentle cleaning with PCE

Do not dry clean

==== Wet cleaning ====
The letter W in a circle is for professional wet cleaning.

Professional wet cleaning

Gentle wet cleaning

Very gentle wet cleaning

Do not wet clean
