= Hydrotrioxide =

Class of chemical compounds

The structure of any hydrotrioxide, where R stands for any group; typically organic

Hydrotrioxides are a class of highly reactive unstable chemical compounds. They have been confirmed to appear inside the atmosphere of Earth.

They are generated when peroxyl radicals (non-ionic superoxides, not to be confused with the hydroperoxyl radical) in the atmosphere react with the hydroxyl radical.

The simplest example of a hydrotrioxide is trioxidane. One may also say hydrogen ozonide is actually the simplest hydrotrioxide.

Triethylsilyl hydrotrioxide is, in theory, capable of being used to generate either singlet oxygen or 1,9-nonanediol.
