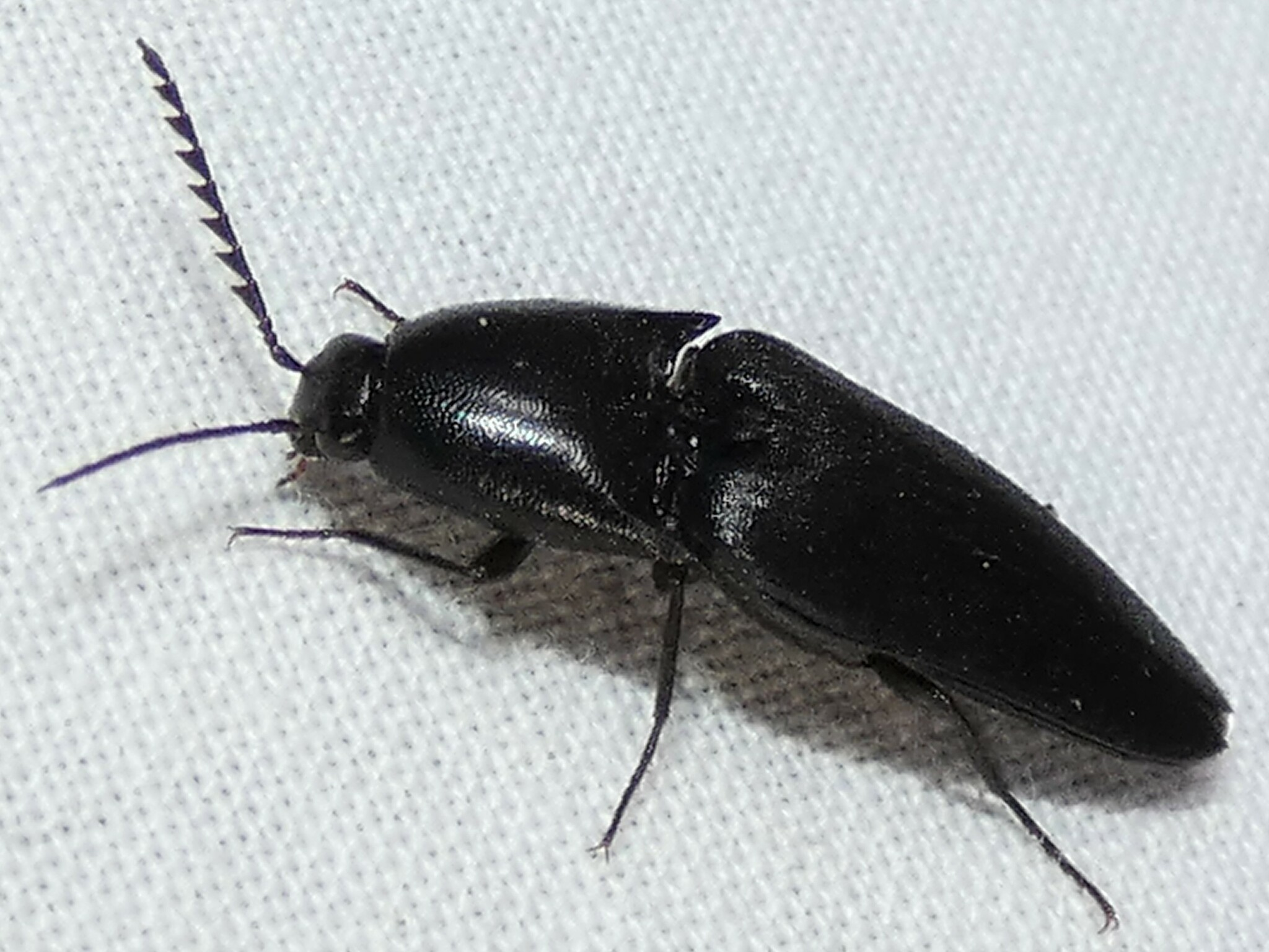

Scientific classification
- Kingdom: Animalia
- Phylum: Arthropoda
- Class: Insecta
- Order: Coleoptera
- Suborder: Polyphaga
- Infraorder: Elateriformia
- Family: Elateridae
- Genus: Parallelostethus
- Species: P. attenuatus

Binomial name
- Parallelostethus attenuatus (Say, 1825)

= Parallelostethus attenuatus =

Species of beetle

Parallelostethus attenuatus is a species of click beetle in the family Elateridae.

1,8-Octanediol di-hexanoate strongly attracts adult male P. attenuatus beetles, and the sex attractant pheromone of the species may consist entirely of this compound.

The morphology of the "hinges" P. attenuatus uses to "click" have been studied in detail.

In Indiana, it is commonly found in rotten logs, eating decaying moist wood tissue. Elateridae in general are common in wood in Indiana.
