= 1-Bromopropane =

- Skeletal formula of n-propyl bromide

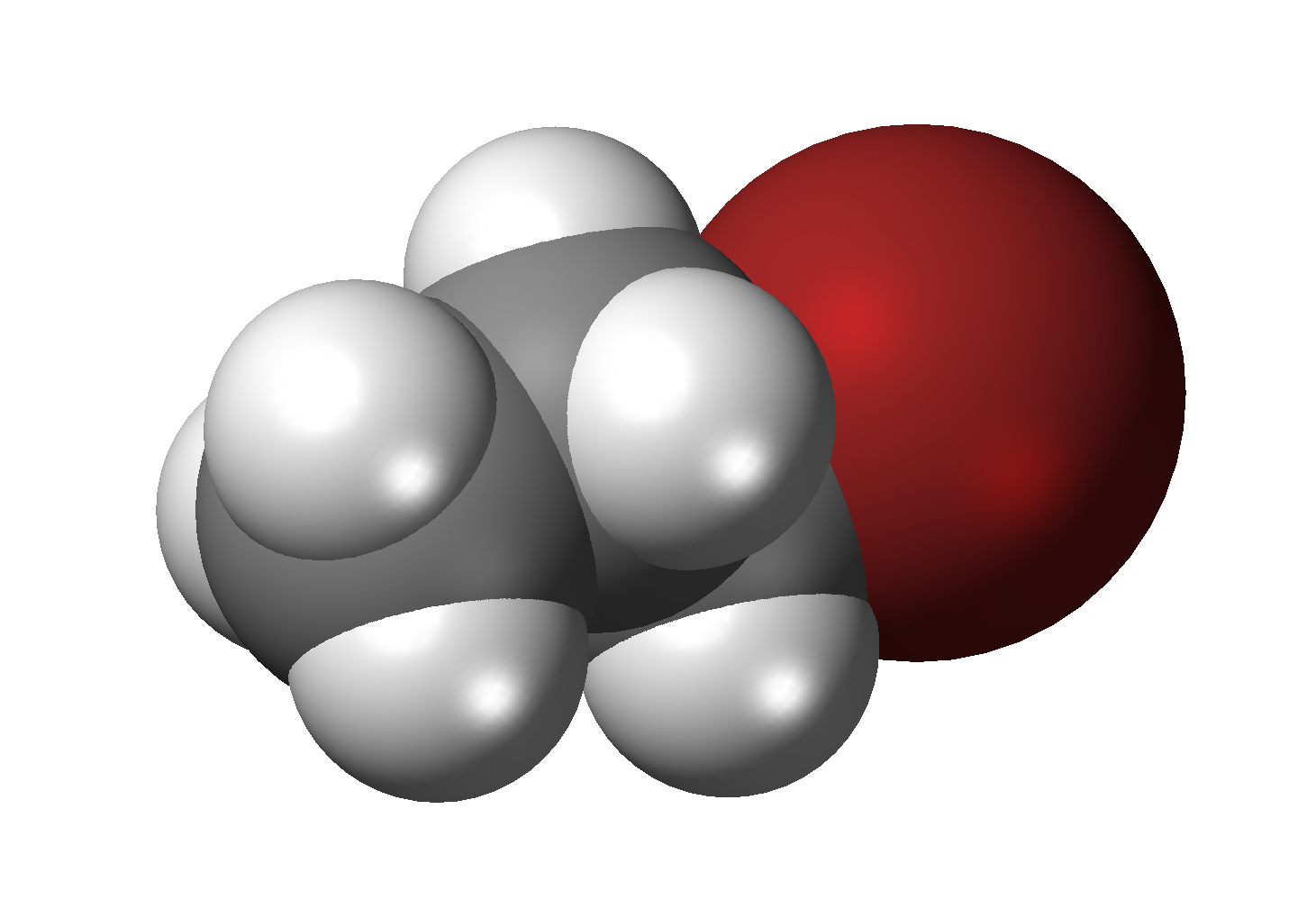
- Spacefill model of 1-Bromopropane

Names
- Preferred IUPAC name 1-Bromopropane
- Other names: Bromopropane, 1-propyl bromide, 1-bromopropane, n-propyl Bromide, DrySolv, FabriSolv

Identifiers
CAS Number	106-94-5
3D model (JSmol)	Interactive image
Abbreviations	n-PB; PrBr n-PrBr nPrBr^{n}PrBr
Beilstein Reference	505936
ChEBI	CHEBI:47105
ChEMBL	ChEMBL1230095
ChemSpider	7552
ECHA InfoCard	100.003.133
EC Number	203-445-0
MeSH	1-bromopropane
PubChem CID	7840
RTECS number	TX4110000
UNII	Y9746DNE68
UN number	2344
CompTox Dashboard (EPA)	DTXSID6021874
- InChI: InChI=1S/C3H7Br/c1-2-3-4/h2-3H2,1H3 Key: CYNYIHKIEHGYOZ-UHFFFAOYSA-N
- SMILES: CCCBr

Properties
Chemical formula	C_{3}H_{7}Br
Molar mass	122.993 g·mol^{−1}
Appearance	Colorless liquid
Density	1.354 g mL^{−1}
Melting point	−110.5 °C; −166.8 °F; 162.7 K
Boiling point	70.3 to 71.3 °C; 158.4 to 160.2 °F; 343.4 to 344.4 K
Solubility in water	2.5 g L^{−1} (at 20 °C)
Solubility in ethanol	Miscible
Solubility in diethyl ether	Miscible
log P	2.319
Vapor pressure	19.5 kPa (at 20 °C)
Henry's law constant (k_{H})	1.4 μmol Pa^{−1} kg^{−1}
Refractive index (n_{D})	1.43414
Viscosity	5.241 mPa s (at 20 °C)

Thermochemistry
Heat capacity (C)	134.6 J K^{−1} mol^{−1}
Std enthalpy of formation (Δ_{f}H^{⦵}_{298})	−125.8 to −123.0 kJ mol^{−1}
Std enthalpy of combustion (Δ_{c}H^{⦵}_{298})	−2.0580 to −2.0552 MJ mol^{−1}

Hazards
- GHS labelling
Pictograms	(GHS02: Flammable) (GHS07: Exclamation mark) (GHS08: Health hazard)
Signal word	Danger
Hazard statements	H225, H315, H319, H335, H336, H360, H373
Precautionary statements	P201, P210, P261, P305+P351+P338, P308+P313
NFPA 704 (fire diamond)	2 3 0
Flash point	22 °C (72 °F; 295 K)
Autoignition temperature	490 °C (914 °F; 763 K)
Explosive limits	4.6–?%
- Lethal dose or concentration (LD, LC)
LD_{50} (median dose)	2.950 mg kg^{−1} (intraperitoneal, rat)

Related compounds
Related alkanes	Bromoethane; 2-Bromopropane; tert-Butyl bromide; 1-Bromobutane; 2-Bromobutane
- Except where otherwise noted, data are given for materials in their standard state (at 25 °C [77 °F], 100 kPa). verify (what is ?) Infobox references

1-Bromopropane (also known as n-propyl bromide or nPB) is a bromoalkane with the chemical formula C_{3}H_{7}Br or CH_{3}CH_{2}CH_{2}Br. It is a colorless, flammable liquid that is used as a solvent. It has a characteristic hydrocarbon odor. Its industrial applications increased dramatically in the 21st century due to the phasing out of chlorofluorocarbons and chloroalkanes such as 1,1,1-trichloroethane under the Montreal Protocol. It was also used as a dry cleaning solvent as a substitute for perchloroethylene for a short time in the United States. 1-Bromopropane is highly neurotoxic to humans.

== Preparation ==
Industrial routes to 1-bromopropane involve free-radical additions to the corresponding alkenes. In this way, the anti-Markovnikov product is obtained. Alternatively, n‑propanol may be substitutively brominated. The latter reaction is also viable laboratory synthesis.

One laboratory technique for substitutive bromination treats propanol with a mixture of hydrobromic and sulfuric acids:

CH_{3}CH_{2}CH_{2}OH + HBr → CH_{3}CH_{2}CH_{2}Br + H_{2}O

Alternate synthetic routes include treating propanol with phosphorus tribromide or via a Hunsdiecker reaction with butyric acid.

== Applications ==
Like many other liquid halocarbons, 1-bromopropane finds use as a liquid or gaseous solvent. It is a solvent for adhesives in aerosol glues that glue foam cushions together. It is a solvent in asphalt production, in the aviation industry for maintenance, and in synthetic fiber production. It is a solvent for degreasing plastics, optics and on metal surfaces, to remove soldering residues from electronic circuit boards. It is an aggressive solvent with a Kauri-butanol value of 129 which is similar to 1,1,1-trichloroethane.

It was used in dry-cleaning in the United States, introduced in 2006. It was represented by the FabriSolv and DrySolv products. Its increasing use in the 21st century resulted from the need for a substitute for chlorofluorocarbons (such as CFC-113) and perchloroethylene as a dry cleaning solvent, however its use in dry cleaning has been steadily declining and by 2020, its use for dry cleaning is nearly obsolete while perchloroethylene remained the most common solvent in dry cleaning as of 2024. Dry cleaning machines used with 1-Bromopropane were converted PERC machines.

== Regulation ==
In the European Union, 1-bromopropane has been classified as reproductive toxicant per Registration, Evaluation, Authorisation and Restriction of Chemicals, which makes it a "substance of very high concern".

As of January 5, 2022, 1-bromopropane has been added to the United States Clean Air Act list of Hazardous Air Pollutants (HAP).

Since 2007, it has been approved for use under the U.S. EPA's Significant New Alternatives Policy (SNAP) as a suitable replacement for ozone depleting chemicals. In 2013, the U.S. EPA announced that, based on a work plan developed under the Toxic Substances Control Act of 1976, it would begin a full risk assessment of 1-Bromopropane. In December 2022, the U.S. EPA released a revised risk determination from the August 2020 risk evaluation, used to form a proposed risk management rule in July 2024.

The North Carolina Department of Labor's Occupational Safety and Health Division issued a Hazard Alert in 6/2014, as it "is not regulated to protect workers, consumers or the environment".

== Safety ==
In 2003, the American Conference of Governmental Industrial Hygienists (ACGIH) set the time-weighted average threshold limit value for an 8-hour exposure at 10 parts per million (ppm). In 2014, the ACGIH adopted a lower threshold limit value of 0.1 ppm as an 8-hour time-weighted average. The California Occupational Safety and Health Administration set the permissible exposure limit at 5 ppm in 2010. Though symptoms of overexposure can begin within 2 days of exposure, typically long-term exposure is more harmful.

In 2008, the U.S. CDC recommended that use of 1-bromopropane as a replacement for perchloroethylene may require adjustment and modification of equipment, improved ventilation, and use of personal protective equipment.

In 2013, a peer-review panel convened by the U.S. National Toxicology Program unanimously recommended that 1-bromopropane, be classified as reasonably anticipated human carcinogens.

Extended occupational exposure to 1-bromopropane in higher concentrations than recommended has resulted in significant injury to workers in the United States. Its use as a solvent in aerosol glues used to glue foam cushions has been especially controversial. Reported symptoms of overexposure affect the nervous system and include confusion, slurred speech, dizziness, paresthesias, and difficulty walking, unusual fatigue and headaches, development of arthralgias, visual disturbances (difficulty focusing), and muscle twitching. Symptoms may persist over one year. Other symptoms include irritation of mucous membranes, eyes, upper respiratory tract, and skin, as well as transient loss of consciousness. Loss of feeling in the feet, an example of paresthesia, is colloquially called "dead foot" by workers who suffer from it. Of nationwide "more than 140 cushion workers nationwide, mostly from plants in Utah, Mississippi and North Carolina,[...] that had been exposed to dangerous levels of the chemical, many of them sickened and [are] unable to walk". One worker's long-term exposure resulting in neurological damage was covered in the NY Times. Air sampling for the level of 1-bromopropane and monitoring workers' urine for metabolites are both effective at measuring workers' exposure.

Occupational exposure to 1-bromopropane typically occurs through breathing or skin contact; it is easily absorbed into the blood via the skin. Replacing 1-bromopropane with water or acetone-based adhesives is the preferred NIOSH option for controlling occupational exposure, but other options include engineering controls like isolation and ventilation, administrative controls, and PPE that includes respiratory and skin protection. 1-Bromopropane can penetrate most gloves, but not those made of polyvinyl alcohol or laminates.

=== Animal studies ===
Animal studies of 1-bromopropane have shown that it is a carcinogen in those models. Rodents exposed to 1-bromopropane developed lung, colon, and skin cancer at higher rates.

== Environmental impact ==
=== Stratospheric ozone layer damage ===
Although 1-bromopropane is naturally produced, it is one of the very short-lived substances that depletes ozone. Because 1-bromopropane is so short-lived, its ozone depletion potential (ODP) is dependent on the latitude where it is released. According to the United States Environmental Protection Agency, the ODP is 0.013-0.018 in U.S. latitudes and 0.071-0.100 in tropical latitudes.
