= Very short-lived substances =

Ozone-depleting substances in Earth's stratosphere

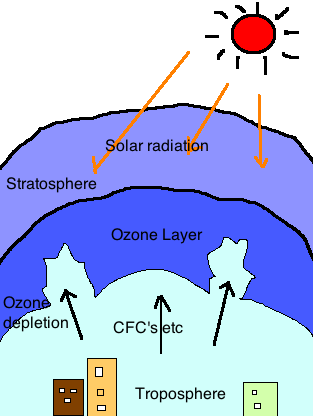
A steady decline of about four percent in the total amount of ozone in Earth's stratosphere (the ozone layer), and a much larger springtime decrease in stratospheric ozone around Earth's polar regions.

Very short-lived substances (VSLS) are ozone-depleting halogen-containing substances found in the stratosphere. These substances have very short lifetimes, typically less than 6 months. VSLS are responsible for atmospheric damage once they enter the stratosphere and are a contributing factor to the destruction of ozone.

== Description ==
VSLS are ozone-depleting halogen-containing substances found in the stratosphere. These substances have very short lifetimes, typically less than 6 months. Approximately 90% of VSLS are produced by natural processes and their rate of production is increasing. “They are bromine compounds produced by seaweed and the ocean's phytoplankton”. Only 10% of ozone deleting chlorine compounds are man-made. VSLS are responsible for atmospheric damage once they enter the stratosphere and are a contributing factor to the destruction of the ozone layer. In previous decades it was believed that the most significant factor in ozone depletion was the increase in chlorofluorocarbons (CFCs). Currently VSLS are increasing rapidly, mainly due to industrial activities. The primary VSLS is n-propyl bromide (C_{3}H_{7}Br). It has been forecast that brominated VSLS will increase to about 8 - 10% of the total VSLS emission by the end of 21st century. There has not been much research in this area, although this is changing as more scientists study this substance to predict its long-term impact on ozone levels.

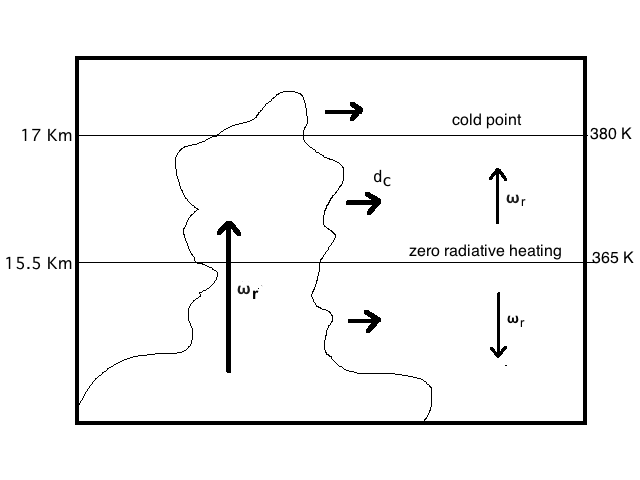
Schematic of vertical transport in the TTL. Beside the slow large-scale transport driven by diabatic heating rates or there is a fast localized convective mass flux wc. The amount of air leaving the convective cloud is given by the convective detrainment rate dc.

== Transport ==
The most significant route of air entering the stratosphere is through the tropical tropopause layer (TTL) via convection. The air masses are shifted by convection are able to rise several kilometers within a few hours. This transport mechanism is fast enough for VSLS lifetimes.

== Effects ==
Despite their short lifespan, VSLS have been shown to contribute significantly towards the depletion of the ozone layer, particularly in the lower stratosphere above mid-latitude areas. One study has shown that every five additional parts per trillion by volume (pptv) of VSLS in the atmosphere reducesthe global ozone column by about 1.3%. Long-term calculations of VSLS injection into the stratosphere reveal a robust correlation between sea surface temperature, convective activity and the number of short-lived source gases in the tropical tropopause layer (TTL), which becomes especially clear during the perturbations induced by El Niño seasons. This trend is attributed to increased activity by bromine-generating marine life under warmer temperatures and indicates that VSLS concentration will likely increase over the 21st century due to climate change. The potential significant increases in the atmospheric abundance of short-lived halogen substances, through changing natural processes or continued anthropogenic emissions could be important for future climate.
