= 1,8-Octanediol =

Names
- Preferred IUPAC name Octane-1,8-diol
- Other names 1,8-Octanediol; Octamethylene glycol 1,8-Dihydroxyoctane

Identifiers
CAS Number	629-41-4
3D model (JSmol)	Interactive image
Beilstein Reference	1633499
ChEBI	CHEBI:44630
ChemSpider	62628
ECHA InfoCard	100.010.083
EC Number	214-254-7
Gmelin Reference	1524772
KEGG	C14218
PubChem CID	69420
UNII	806K32R50Z
CompTox Dashboard (EPA)	DTXSID2022416
- InChI: InChI=1S/C8H18O2/c9-7-5-3-1-2-4-6-8-10/h9-10H,1-8H2 Key: OEIJHBUUFURJLI-UHFFFAOYSA-N; InChI=1/C8H18O2/c9-7-5-3-1-2-4-6-8-10/h9-10H,1-8H2 Key: OEIJHBUUFURJLI-UHFFFAOYAW
- SMILES: OCCCCCCCCO

Properties
Chemical formula	C_{8}H_{18}O_{2}
Molar mass	146.227 g/mol
Appearance	White solid
Melting point	57 to 61 °C (135 to 142 °F; 330 to 334 K)
Boiling point	278.8 °C at 760 mmHg; 172 °C (342 °F; 445 K) at 20 mmHg
Solubility in water	Slightly soluble

Hazards
NFPA 704 (fire diamond)	1 0 0
Flash point	148 °C (298 °F; 421 K)
Safety data sheet (SDS)	GFS Chemicals, Inc. MSDS

Related compounds
Related compounds	1,9-Nonanediol; 1,7-Heptanediol; 1,2-Octanediol
- Except where otherwise noted, data are given for materials in their standard state (at 25 °C [77 °F], 100 kPa). verify (what is ?) Infobox references

1,8-Octanediol, also known as octamethylene glycol, is a diol with the molecular formula HO(CH_{2})_{8}OH, a white solid. It can be produced with high purity by hydrogenation of esters of suberic acid.

1,8-Octanediol, which has a low melting temperature, can be found at high purity for relatively low cost. These characteristics are ideal for a reference material at moderate temperature in the context of solid-liquid phase-changing materials (PCMs).

1,8-Octanediol dihexanoate strongly attracts adult male Parallelostethus attenuatus click beetles, and the pheromone of this species may consist entirely of this compound.

== Applications ==
=== Cosmetics ===
It is sometimes an ingredient of cosmetics as a plasticizer.

As with other fatty alcohols, octane-1,8-diol is used in cosmetics as an emollient and humectant.

=== Polymers ===
1,8-Octanediol is used as a monomer in the synthesis of some polymers such as polyesters and polyurethanes.

For example, poly(octanediol-co-citrate) is a biodegradable polymer that can be made antibacterial for biomedical applications. This polymer, abbreviated POC and also sometimes called poly(octamethylene-citrate), is promising as a biocompatible and biodegradable polymer, and has been extensively investigated in relation to soft tissue engineering.

A polymer created from 1,8-octanediol, citric acid, and sebacic acid, called polyoctanediol citrate/sebacate [p(OCS)], has also been synthesized.

== See also ==
- Ethylene glycol
- 1,2-Octanediol
