= Prenderol =

Chemical compound

Identifiers
- IUPAC name: 2,2-diethyl-1,3-propanediol
- CAS Number: 115-76-4
- PubChem CID: 8284
- ChemSpider: 7983
- UNII: A40PF8120T
- ChEBI: CHEBI:134759
- CompTox Dashboard (EPA): DTXSID50150923
- ECHA InfoCard: 100.003.731

Chemical and physical data
- Formula: C_{7}H_{16}O_{2}
- Molar mass: 132.203 g·mol^{−1}
- 3D model (JSmol): Interactive image
- Melting point: 59–62 °C (138–144 °F)
- SMILES: CCC(CC)(CO)CO
- InChI: InChI=1S/C7H16O2/c1-3-7(4-2,5-8)6-9/h8-9H,3-6H2,1-2H3; Key:XRVCFZPJAHWYTB-UHFFFAOYSA-N

Prenderol (Diethylpropanediol) is a simple alkyl diol which has sedative, anticonvulsant and muscle relaxant effects. It is closely related in structure to meprobamate and numerous other alkyl alcohols and diols with generally comparable activity.

== Synthesis ==
Treatment of the aldehyde 2-ethylbutyraldehyde with formaldehyde and potassium hydroxide gives a crossed Cannizzaro reaction yielding prenderol.

== See also ==
- MC-2973 (2,2-Diethyl-1,4-butanediol)
- 1,3-Propanediol
- 2-Methyl-2-propyl-1,3-propanediol
- Phenaglycodol
