= MC-2973 =

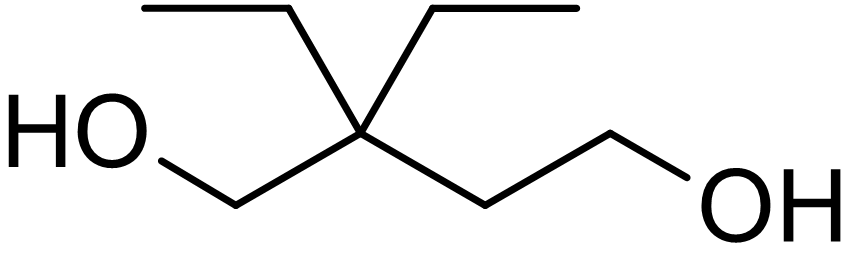

Names
- IUPAC name 2,2-Diethyl-1,4-butanediol
- Other names Diethylbutanediol; DEB

Identifiers
3D model (JSmol)	Interactive image
ChemSpider	2293216
PubChem CID	3027720
- InChI: InChI=1S/C8H18O2/c1-3-8(4-2,7-10)5-6-9/h9-10H,3-7H2,1-2H3 Key: VXLUKYMRBUQHAY-UHFFFAOYSA-N
- SMILES: CCC(CC)(CCO)CO

Properties
Chemical formula	C_{8}H_{18}O_{2}
Molar mass	146.230 g·mol^{−1}
Appearance	Oily liquid
- Except where otherwise noted, data are given for materials in their standard state (at 25 °C [77 °F], 100 kPa). Infobox references

MC-2973 (2,2-diethyl-1,4-butanediol) is a diol with convulsant effects. It also has applications in the synthesis of polymers.

== See also ==
- 2-Methyl-2-propyl-1,3-propanediol
- Prenderol (2,2-diethyl-1,3-propanediol)
