= 2-Hexoxyethanol =

Names
- Preferred IUPAC name 2-(Hexyloxy)ethan-1-ol
- Other names Ethylene glycol monohexyl ether

Identifiers
CAS Number	112-25-4
3D model (JSmol)	Interactive image
ChEMBL	ChEMBL3188016
ChemSpider	7878
ECHA InfoCard	100.003.592
EC Number	203-951-1
PubChem CID	8170
RTECS number	KL2450000
UNII	7P0O8282NR
CompTox Dashboard (EPA)	DTXSID1026908
- InChI: InChI=1S/C8H18O2/c1-2-3-4-5-7-10-8-6-9/h9H,2-8H2,1H3 Key: UPGSWASWQBLSKZ-UHFFFAOYSA-N
- SMILES: CCCCCCOCCO

Properties
Chemical formula	C_{8}H_{18}O_{2}
Molar mass	146.230 g·mol^{−1}
Appearance	Colorless hygroscopic liquid
Odor	Characteristic
Density	0.89
Melting point	−45 °C (−49 °F; 228 K)
Boiling point	208.3 °C (406.9 °F; 481.4 K)

Hazards
- Occupational safety and health (OHS/OSH)
Main hazards	Corrosive, Irritant
- GHS labelling
Pictograms	(GHS05: Corrosive) (GHS07: Exclamation mark)
Signal word	Danger
Hazard statements	H302, H312, H314
Precautionary statements	P260, P264, P270, P280, P301+P312, P301+P330+P331, P302+P352, P303+P361+P353, P304+P340, P305+P351+P338, P310, P312, P321, P322, P330, P363, P405, P501
Flash point	81.7 °C (179.1 °F; 354.8 K)
- Except where otherwise noted, data are given for materials in their standard state (at 25 °C [77 °F], 100 kPa). (what is ?) Infobox references

2-Hexoxyethanol, or 2-(hexyloxy)ethanol, is a glycol ether that has a chemical formula of C_{8}H_{18}O_{2.}

== Uses ==
2-Hexoxyethanol is used by professional workers (widespread uses), consumers, in re-packing or re-formulation, in manufacturing, and at industrial sites. It is used as high-boiling solvent. It also serves as an intermediate for neopentanoate and hexyloxyethyl phosphate. It serves as a coalescing agent in cleaners and latex paints.

Other uses of 2-hexoxyethanol are:

- Sealants
- Adhesives
- Coating products
- Finger Paints
- Fillers
- Anti-freeze products
- Plasters
- Putties
- Lubricants
- Modelling Clay
- Greases
- Automotive care products
- Machine wash liquids/detergents
- Air fresheners
- Fragrances
- Other outdoor use

== Hazards ==
According to the European Chemicals Agency, it is classified as harmful when in contact with skin and when swallowed. It can also cause skin burns and serious eye damage.

2-Hexoxyethanol was also known to cause kidney injury and depression. It is also a severe respiratory tract irritant. It may also have blood effects. It may enter the body through ingestion, aerosol inhalation, and through the skin.

It may form explosive peroxides. It can react violently with strong oxidants.

It is classified as a green circle product EPA Safer Choice meaning it is of low concern.
