= Dibutoxymethane =

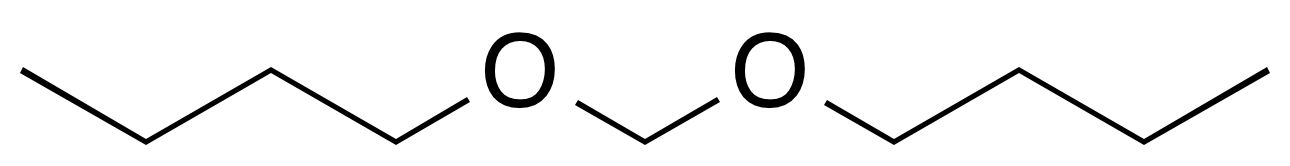

Names
- Preferred IUPAC name 1-(Butoxymethoxy)butane
- Other names Butylal, formaldehyde dibutyl acetal

Identifiers
CAS Number	2568-90-3
3D model (JSmol)	Interactive image
ChemSpider	16443
ECHA InfoCard	100.018.100
EC Number	219-909-0
PubChem CID	17379
UNII	V5WWR58LDU
CompTox Dashboard (EPA)	DTXSID3062528
- InChI: InChI=1S/C9H20O2/c1-3-5-7-10-9-11-8-6-4-2/h3-9H2,1-2H3 Key: QLCJOAMJPCOIDI-UHFFFAOYSA-N
- SMILES: CCCCOCOCCCC

Properties
Chemical formula	C_{9}H_{20}O_{2}
Molar mass	160.257 g·mol^{−1}
Density	0.838
Melting point	−60 °C (−76 °F; 213 K)
Boiling point	179.2 °C (354.6 °F; 452.3 K)
Solubility in water	insoluble
Refractive index (n_{D})	1.406

Hazards
- GHS labelling
Pictograms	(GHS02: Flammable) (GHS07: Exclamation mark)
Signal word	Warning
Hazard statements	H226, H315, H412
Precautionary statements	P210, P233, P240, P241, P242, P243, P264, P273, P280, P302+P352, P303+P361+P353, P321, P332+P313, P362, P370+P378, P403+P235, P501
- Except where otherwise noted, data are given for materials in their standard state (at 25 °C [77 °F], 100 kPa). Infobox references

Dibutoxymethane or butylal, is an oligoether (more than one -O- grouping) or acetal containing two butyl groups and a methylene grouping.

== Uses ==
Dibutoxymethane is used as a solvent and can be classed as a green solvent, as it contains no halogens, and is not very toxic. It is used in cosmetics, as a cleansing agent, or solvent. It reduces the formation of soot and nitrogen oxides when added to diesel fuel.

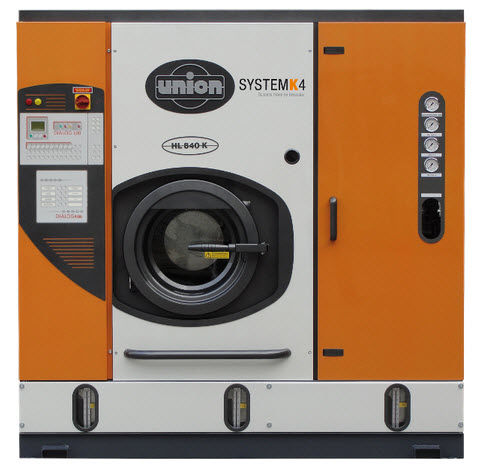
A modern dry cleaning machine by Union for use with dibutoxymethane.

It has also been used as a dry-cleaning solvent under the trade name SolvonK4, marketed by the Kreussler Company in 2010. It dissolves both water-based and oil-based stains.

== Production ==
Butylal is produced by the reaction of n-butanol with formaldehyde or formaldehyde derivatives such as 1,3,5-trioxane and paraformaldehyde.

== Health and safety ==
As butylal is a relatively new solvent in use, a little is known about its toxicological and ecological profile. It is a combustible liquid.

Butylal undergoes hydrolysis to produce butanol and formaldehyde. Both compounds have been detected in very low concentrations inside dry-cleaning facilities using the solvent. Formaldehyde is an irritant and a known human carcinogen.
