= 1,9-Nonanediol =

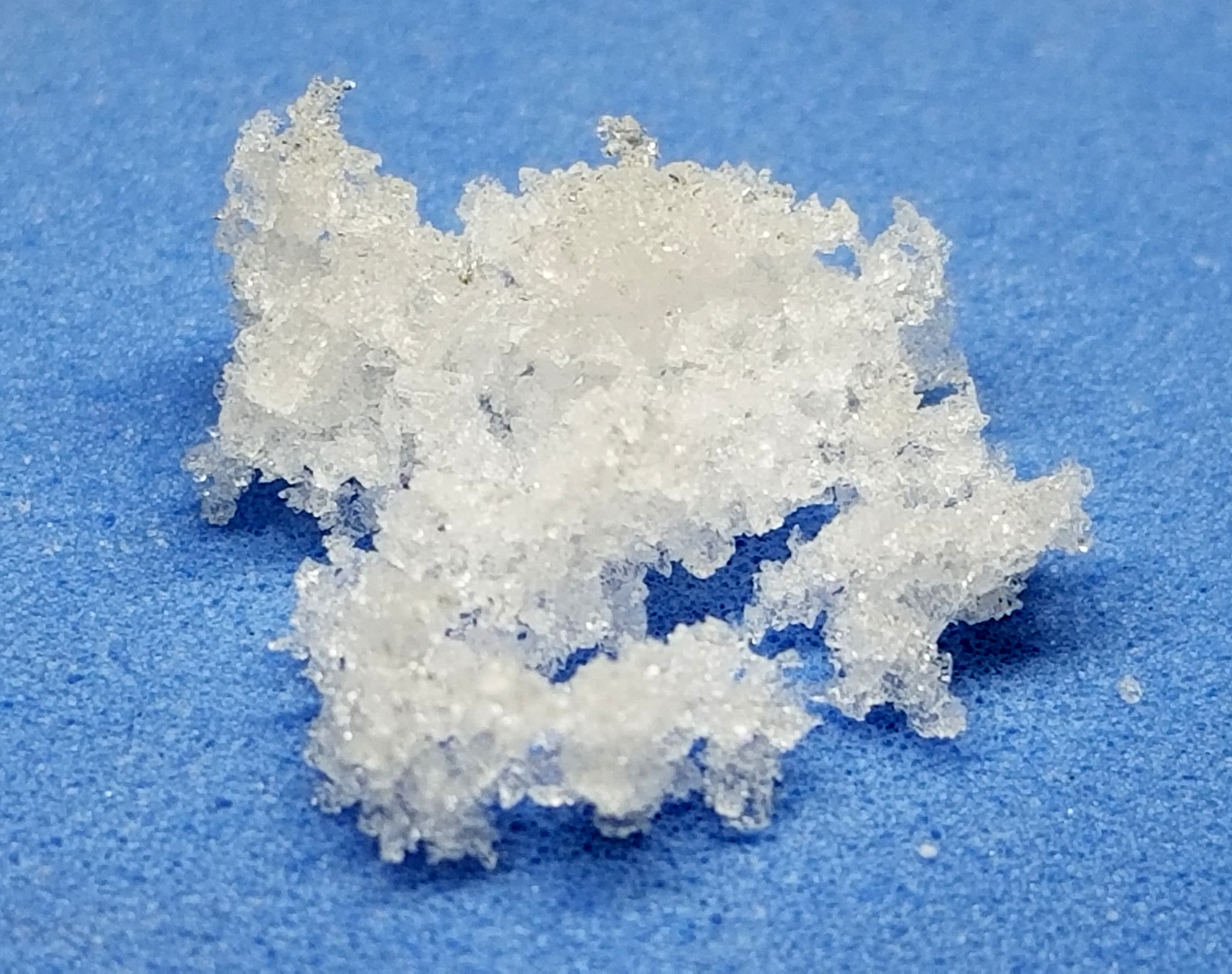

Names
- Preferred IUPAC name 1,9-Nonanediol
- Other names 1,9-Dihydroxynonane

Identifiers
CAS Number	3937-56-2
3D model (JSmol)	Interactive image
ChEBI	CHEBI:167089
ChemSpider	18685
ECHA InfoCard	100.021.380
EC Number	223-517-5
PubChem CID	19835
UNII	N4385C65C6
CompTox Dashboard (EPA)	DTXSID5063237
- InChI: InChI=1S/C9H20O2/c10-8-6-4-2-1-3-5-7-9-11/h10-11H,1-9H2 Key: ALVZNPYWJMLXKV-UHFFFAOYSA-N
- SMILES: C(CCCCO)CCCCO

Properties
Chemical formula	C_{9}H_{20}O_{2}
Molar mass	160.25 g/mol
Appearance	White solid
Melting point	46.4 °C (115.5 °F; 319.5 K)
Boiling point	173 °C (343 °F; 446 K) at 20 mmHg

Thermochemistry
Std enthalpy of formation (Δ_{f}H^{⦵}_{298})	-657.6 kJ/mol
- Except where otherwise noted, data are given for materials in their standard state (at 25 °C [77 °F], 100 kPa). verify (what is ?) Infobox references

1,9-Nonanediol, also known as nonamethylene glycol, is a diol with the molecular formula HO(CH_{2})_{9}OH. It is a colorless solid, which is sparingly soluble in water but readily soluble in ethanol.

1,9-nonanediol can be produced by isomerization of allyl alcohol. It can also be obtained by reacting methyl oleate with triethylsilyl hydrotrioxide and lithium aluminum hydride.

1,9-Nonanediol is used as a monomer in the synthesis of some polymers. It is also used as an intermediate in the manufacturing of aromatic chemicals and in the pharmaceutical industry.

== See also ==
- Ethylene glycol
- 1,2-Octanediol
