= Etohexadiol =

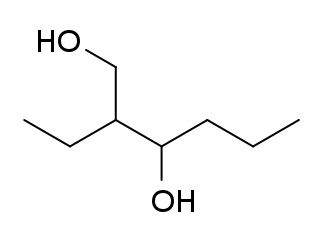

Names
- IUPAC name 2-ethylhexane-1,3-diol

Identifiers
CAS Number	94-96-2
3D model (JSmol)	Interactive image
ChEMBL	ChEMBL1451179
ChemSpider	21106534
ECHA InfoCard	100.002.162
KEGG	C14271
PubChem CID	7211
UNII	M9JGK7U88V
CompTox Dashboard (EPA)	DTXSID4025292
- InChI: InChI=1S/C8H18O2/c1-3-5-8(10)7(4-2)6-9/h7-10H,3-6H2,1-2H3 Key: RWLALWYNXFYRGW-UHFFFAOYSA-N; InChI=1/C8H18O2/c1-3-5-8(10)7(4-2)6-9/h7-10H,3-6H2,1-2H3 Key: RWLALWYNXFYRGW-UHFFFAOYAO
- SMILES: CCCC(C(CC)CO)O

Properties
Chemical formula	C_{8}H_{18}O_{2}
Molar mass	146.230 g·mol^{−1}

Pharmacology
ATC code	P03BX06 (WHO)
- Except where otherwise noted, data are given for materials in their standard state (at 25 °C [77 °F], 100 kPa). verify (what is ?) Infobox references

Etohexadiol (or ethohexadiol) is an ectoparasiticide. It was known as the insect repellent "6-12" (Six-twelve), or Rutgers 612. Its use in the U.S. was halted in 1991 after it was shown to cause developmental defects in animals.
