= GINETEX =

GINETEX logo

The Groupement International d'Etiquetage pour l'Entretien des Textiles, 'International Grouping of Labeling for the Maintenance of Textiles' (GINETEX) is the international association for textile care labeling, based in Clichy, France. GINETEX relies on 22 national members in 23 nations spanning Europe, South America, Africa, and Asia. The national committees are mandated to represent the organization and to ensure the correct use of the garment wash care symbols in their territory.

GINETEX has regulated care labels since 1975.

== See also ==
- Laundry symbol
