= Dimethyl carbate =

Names
- IUPAC name Dimethyl (1R,2S,3R,4S)-bicyclo[2.2.1]hept-5-ene-2,3-dicarboxylate
- Other names Dimethyl cis-5-norbornene-2,3-dicarboxylate; Dimalone

Identifiers
CAS Number	39589-98-5
3D model (JSmol)	Interactive image
ChEBI	CHEBI:136029
ChemSpider	10430159
PubChem CID	10921747
UNII	BN2PH0TQOD
CompTox Dashboard (EPA)	DTXSID701032069
- InChI: InChI=1S/C11H14O4/c1-14-10(12)8-6-3-4-7(5-6)9(8)11(13)15-2/h3-4,6-9H,5H2,1-2H3/t6-,7+,8-,9+ Key: VGQLNJWOULYVFV-SPJNRGJMSA-N; InChI=1/C11H14O4/c1-14-10(12)8-6-3-4-7(5-6)9(8)11(13)15-2/h3-4,6-9H,5H2,1-2H3/t6-,7+,8-,9+ Key: VGQLNJWOULYVFV-SPJNRGJMBT
- SMILES: O=C(OC)[C@@H]2[C@H](C(=O)OC)[C@H]\1C[C@@H]2/C=C/1

Properties
Chemical formula	C_{11}H_{14}O_{4}
Molar mass	210.229 g·mol^{−1}
Density	1.4852 g/cm^{3}
Melting point	38 °C (100 °F; 311 K)

Pharmacology
ATC code	P03BX05 (WHO)
- Except where otherwise noted, data are given for materials in their standard state (at 25 °C [77 °F], 100 kPa). Infobox references

Dimethyl carbate is an insect repellent. It can be prepared by the Diels–Alder reaction of dimethyl maleate and cyclopentadiene.
