= Kauri-butanol value =

Measure of solvent performance

The kauri-butanol value ("Kb value") is an international, standardized measure of solvent power for a hydrocarbon solvent, and is governed by an ASTM standardized test, ASTM D1133. The result of this test is a scaleless index, usually referred to as the "Kb value". A higher Kb value means the solvent is more aggressive or active in the ability to dissolve certain materials. Mild solvents have low scores in the tens and twenties; powerful solvents like chlorinated solvents and naphthenic aromatic solvents (i.e. "High Sol 10", "High Sol 15") have ratings that are in the low hundreds. For example the KB values for halogenated solvents are; 129 for 1-Bromopropane, 136 for dichloromethane, 90 for tetrachloroethylene and 64 for parachlorobenzotrifluoride. KB values for non-halogenated solvents vary more, aliphatic hydrocarbon solvents have KB values in the 30s meanwhile toluene has a KB value of 105.

In terms of the test itself, the kauri-butanol value (Kb) of a chemical shows the maximum amount of the hydrocarbon that can be added to a solution of kauri resin (a thick, gum-like material) in butanol (butyl alcohol) without causing cloudiness. Since kauri resin is readily soluble in butyl alcohol but not in most hydrocarbon solvents, the resin solution will tolerate only a certain amount of dilution. "Stronger" solvents such as benzene can be added in a greater amount (and thus have a higher Kb value) than "weaker" solvents like mineral spirits.
