= 1,2-Octanediol =

Names
- Preferred IUPAC name Octane-1,2-diol
- Other names 1,2-Octanediol; Caprylyl glycol Glycol caprylyl 1,2-Dihydroxyoctane; 1,2-Octylene glycol

Identifiers
CAS Number	1117-86-8
3D model (JSmol)	Interactive image
Beilstein Reference	1719619
ChEBI	CHEBI:34056
ChEMBL	ChEMBL3186864
ChemSpider	13595
ECHA InfoCard	100.012.959
EC Number	214-254-7
KEGG	C14273
PubChem CID	14231
UNII	00YIU5438U
CompTox Dashboard (EPA)	DTXSID9036646
- InChI: InChI=1S/C8H18O2/c1-2-3-4-5-6-8(10)7-9/h8-10H,2-7H2,1H3 Key: AEIJTFQOBWATKX-UHFFFAOYSA-N
- SMILES: CCCCCCC(CO)O

Properties
Chemical formula	C_{8}H_{18}O_{2}
Molar mass	146.227 g/mol
Appearance	White semi-solid
Melting point	30 to 35 °C (86 to 95 °F; 303 to 308 K)
Boiling point	140 °C (284 °F; 413 K) at 16 mmHg

Hazards
- GHS labelling
Pictograms	(GHS07: Exclamation mark)
Signal word	Warning
Hazard statements	H319
Precautionary statements	P264, P270, P280, P301+P312, P305+P351+P338, P310, P330, P337+P313, P501
NFPA 704 (fire diamond)	1 1 0
Flash point	148 °C (298 °F; 421 K)
Safety data sheet (SDS)	Sigma-Aldrich SDS
- Except where otherwise noted, data are given for materials in their standard state (at 25 °C [77 °F], 100 kPa). Infobox references

1,2-Octanediol, also known as caprylyl glycol, is a diol with the molecular formula CH_{3}(CH_{2})_{5}CHOHCH_{2}OH.

It is a common component of many creams and ointments, where it is used as a skin conditioning agent. It is also noted to have some antimicrobial (preserving) ability.

== See also ==
- 1,8-Octanediol
