= Hydrogel encapsulation of quantum dots =

The behavior of quantum dots (QDs) in solution and their interaction with other surfaces is of great importance to biological and industrial applications, such as optical displays, animal tagging, anti-counterfeiting dyes and paints, chemical sensing, and fluorescent tagging. However, unmodified quantum dots tend to be hydrophobic, which precludes their use in stable, water-based colloids. Furthermore, because the ratio of surface area to volume in a quantum dot is much higher than for larger particles, the thermodynamic free energy associated with dangling bonds on the surface is sufficient to impede the quantum confinement of excitons. Once solubilized by encapsulation in either a hydrophobic interior micelle or a hydrophilic exterior micelle, the QDs can be successfully introduced into an aqueous medium, in which they form an extended hydrogel network. In this form, quantum dots can be utilized in several applications that benefit from their unique properties, such as medical imaging and thermal destruction of malignant cancers.

== Quantum dots ==
Quantum dots (QDs) are nano-scale semiconductor particles on the order of 2–10 nm in diameter. They possess electrical properties between those of bulk semi-conductors and individual molecules, as well as optical characteristics that make them suitable for applications where fluorescence is desirable, such as medical imaging. Most QDs synthesized for medical imaging are in the form of CdSe(ZnS) core(shell) particles. CdSe QDs have been shown to possess optical properties superior to organic dyes. The ZnS shell has a two-fold effect:

1. to interact with dangling bonds that would otherwise result in particle aggregation, loss of visual resolution, and impedance of quantum confinement effects
2. to further increase the fluorescence of the particles themselves.

=== Problems with CdSe(ZnS) quantum dots ===
Despite their potential for use as contrast agents for medical imaging techniques, their use in vivo is hindered by the cytotoxicity of cadmium. To address this issue, methods have been developed to “wrap” or “encapsulate” potentially-toxic QDs in bio-inert polymers to facilitate use in living tissue. While Cd-free QDs are commercially available, they are unsuitable for use as a substitute for organic contrasts. Another issue with CdSe(ZnS) nanoparticles is significant hydrophobicity, which hinders their ability to enter solution with aqueous media, such as blood or spinal fluid. Certain hydrophilic polymers could be used to render the dots water-soluble.

== Synthesizing the encapsulant polymer ==
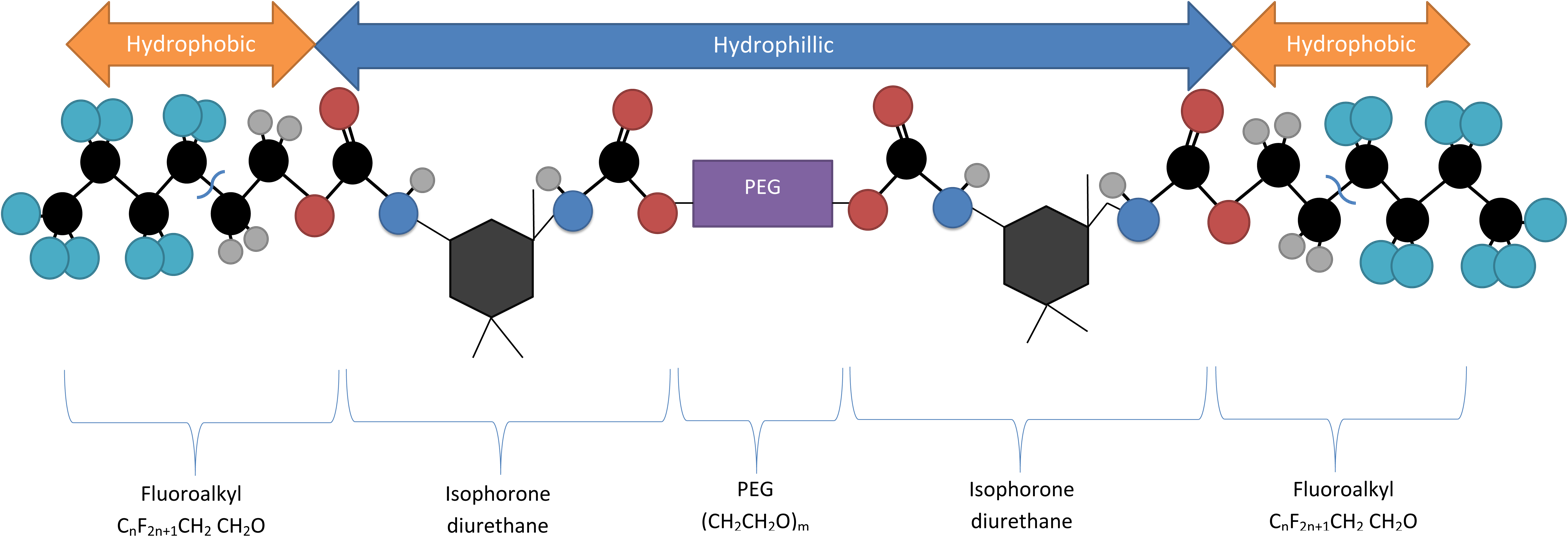
Structure of R_{f}-Polymer used in hydrogel encapsulation of quantum dots. The figure indicates the hydrophobic and hydrophilic regions of the polymer.

=== R_{f}-PEG synthesis ===
One notable quantum dot encapsulation technique involves utilizing a double fluoroalkyl-ended polyethylene glycol molecule (R_{f}-PEG) as a surfactant, which will spontaneously form micellular structures at its critical micelle concentration (CMC). The critical micelle concentration of the R_{f}-PEG depends on the length of the PEG portion of the polymer. This molecule consists of a hydrophilic PEG backbone with two hydrophilic terminal groups (C_{n}F_{2n+1}-CH_{2}CH_{2}O) attached via isophorone diurethane. It is synthesized by dehydrating a solution of 1,3-dimethyl-5-fluorouracil and PEG, mixing them in the presence of heavy water (D_{2}O) via a sonicator to combine then.

Diagram of R_{f}-PEG showing the fluoroalkyl end groups attached to the PEG polymer by intermediate groups.

=== Micellization ===
Polymer micelle with multiple QDs in the middle. The polymer wraps so both the hydrophobic ends are near the QDs and the hydrophilic end is on the outside of the micelle to allow solubility in water.

At the appropriate Krafft temperature and critical micelle concentration these molecules will form individual tear-drop loops, where the hydrophobic ends are attracted to one another, to other molecules, and also to the similarly hydrophobic QDs. This forms a loaded micelle with a hydrophilic outer shell and a hydrophobic core.

When encapsulating hydrophobes in this way it is important to ensure the particle size is appropriate for the PEG backbone being utilized, as the number of PEG mer units (generally with a molecular weight of 6 kDa or 10 kDa) determines the maximum particle size that can be successfully contained at the core of the micelle.

To determine the average diameter, D, of the QDs, the following empirical equation is used:

$${D =\ } {(1.6122\times10^{-9})\lambda^4} - {(2.66575\times10^{-6})\lambda^3} + {(1.6242\times10^{-3})\lambda^2} - {(0.4277)\lambda} + {41.57}$$

Where

- $D$ is the diameter of the CdSe QD in nm
- $\lambda$ is the wavelength of the first absorption peak in nm

==== Role of ZnS shell ====
It is during encapsulation that the ZnS shell plays an especially important role, in that it helps prevent the agglomeration of CdSe particles that had no shell by occupying the previously mentioned bonds on the dot's surface; however, clumping can still occur through secondary forces that arise from common hydrophobicity. This can result in multiple particles within each micelle, which may negatively impact overall resolution. For this reason multiple combinations of PEG chain length and particle diameter are necessary to achieve optimal imaging properties.

Micelles can be cross-linked. The ends of the polymer chain are attracted to two different QD groups.

== Hydrogel network ==
After initial encapsulation the remaining molecules form connections between the individual micelles to form a network within the aqueous media called a hydrogel, creating a diffuse and relatively constant concentration of the encapsulated particle within the gel. The formation of hydrogels is a phenomenon observed in superabsorbent polymers, or "slush powders," in which the polymer, often in the form of a powder, absorbs water, becoming up to 99% liquid and 30-60 times larger in size.

=== Stokes-Einstein equation ===
The diffusivity of a particle decreases as its radius increases.

The diffusivity of spherical particles in a suspension is approximated by the Stokes–Einstein equation:

$D = {k_\text{B}T \over\ 6\pi r\eta},$ where

- $T$ is the temperature
- $r$ is the particle radius
- $k_\text{B}$ is the Boltzmann constant
- $\eta$ is the hydrogel viscosity

Typical R_{f}-PEG hydrogel diffusivities for 2 nm quantum dots are on the order of 10^{−16} m^{2}/s, so suspensions of quantum dots tend to be very stable. Hydrogel viscosity can be determined by using rheological techniques.

== Micelle rheology ==
When encapsulating hydrophobic or potentially toxic materials it is important that the encapsulant remain intact while inside the body. Studying the rheological properties of the micelles permits identification and selection of the polymer that is most appropriate for use in long-term biological applications. R_{f}-PEG exhibits superior rheological properties when used in vivo.

== Importance of polymer length ==
The properties of the polymer are influenced by the chain length. The correct chain length ensures that the encapsulant is not released over time. Avoiding the release of QDs and other toxic particles is critical to prevent unintentional cell necrosis in patients. The length of the polymer is controlled by two factors:

- Weight of the PEG backbone measured in daltons or kilodaltons (Da or kDa),
- Length of the hydrophobic ends, denoted by the number of carbon atoms in the terminal group (C#).

Increasing the PEG length increases the solubility of the polymer. However, if the PEG chain is too long the micelle will become unstable. It has been observed that a stable hydrogel can only be formed with PEG backbones weighing between six and ten kilodaltons.

On the other hand, increasing the length of the hydrophobic terminal groups decreases aqueous solubility. For a given PEG weight, if the hydrophobe is too short the polymer will just dissolve into the solution, and if it is too long the polymer won't dissolve at all. Generally, two end groups result in the highest conversion into micelles (91%):

- $C_{10}F_{21}$
- $C_{8}F_{17}$

=== Maxwell fluid ===
At molecular weights between 6 and 10 kilodaltons the R_{f}-PEG hydrogel acts as a Maxwell material, which means the fluid has both viscosity and elasticity. This is determined by measuring the plateau modulus, the elastic modulus for a viscoelastic polymer is constant or "relaxed" when deformed, at a range of frequencies via oscillatory rheology. Plotting the first- vs second-order integrals of the modulus values, a Cole-Cole plot is obtained, which, when fitted to a Maxwell model, provides the following relationship:

$${G^{\prime\prime}(\omega) =\ } [G^{\prime}(\omega)G_0 - {G^{\prime}(\omega)}^2]^{-{1\over2}}$$

Where

- $G_0$ is the plateau modulus
- $\omega$ is the oscillation frequency in radians per second

=== Mechanical properties of common R_{f}-PEG molecules ===
Based on the Maxwellian behavior of the hydrogel and observations of erosion via surface plasmon resonance (SPR), the following data results for 3 common R_{f}-PEG types at their specified concentrations:

Property	10KC10	10KC8	6KC8
$\text{Composition}\ (wt\%)$	6.8	6.5	11.0
$\text{Relaxation Time}\ (\tau_r)\ (s)$	1.2	0.029	0.023
$\text{Plateau Modulus}\ (G_o)\ (kPa)$	14.4	18.5	56.1
$\text{Viscosity}\ (\eta_o)\ (kPa\cdot s)$	18	0.53	1.5
$\text{Conversion Percent}\ (\%)$	94	94	89

XKCY denotes X thousand daltons of molecular mass and Y carbon atoms.

These values can give us information on the degree of entanglement (or degree of cross linking, depending on what polymer is being considered). In general, higher degrees of entanglement leads to higher time required for the polymer to return to the undeformed state or relaxation times.

== Applications ==
Hydrogel encapsulation of the QDs opens up a new range of applications, such as:

- Biosensors

Enzymes and other bio-active molecules serve as biorecognition units while QDs serve as signalling units. By adding enzymes to the QD hydrogel network both units can be combined to form a biosensor. The enzymatic reaction that detects a particular molecule causes the fluoresce of QDs to be quenched. In this way, the location of molecules of interest can be observed.

- Cell Influence and Imaging

Adding iron oxide nanoparticles to the QD micelles allows them to be fluorescent and magnetic. These micelles can be moved in a magnetic field to create concentration gradients that will influence a cell's processes.

- Gold Hyperthermia

When excited by high energy radiation, such as with a laser, gold nanoparticles emit a thermal field. This phenomenon can be used as a form of hyperthermia therapy to destroy malignant cancers without damaging surrounding tissues. When combined with QDs in a hydrogel this could facilitate real-time monitoring of the tumor treatment.

== See also ==
- Hydrophobe
- Thermodynamics of micellization
- Krafft temperature
- Surfactants
- Detergent
- Entropic force
- Cole–Cole equation
