= Decyl polyglucose =

Synthetic surfactant

Chemical structure of decyl polyglucose (n = 9, m is variable)

Decyl polyglucose is a mild non-ionic synthetic surfactant. It is a type of alkylpolyglycoside derived from glucose or starch and the fatty alcohol decanol. It is commonly used in body washes and shampoos.
