= Dioleoyl-3-trimethylammonium propane =

Surfactant

Names
- IUPAC name 2,3-Bis{[(Z)-octadec-9-enoyl]oxy}propyl-trimethylazanium
- Other names DOTAP

Identifiers
CAS Number	(cation): 113669-21-9; (chloride salt): 132172-61-3; (Methane sulfonate salt): 144189-73-1
3D model (JSmol)	(cation): Interactive image; (chloride salt): Interactive image
ChemSpider	(cation): 4941935; (chloride salt): 9810925
PubChem CID	(cation): 6437371; (chloride salt): 11636182
UNII	(cation): MR86K0XRQP (cation); (chloride salt): 3R78UC794Z
CompTox Dashboard (EPA)	(cation): DTXSID501029587
- InChI: (cation): InChI=1S/C42H80NO4/c1-6-8-10-12-14-16-18-20-22-24-26-28-30-32-34-36-41(44)46-39-40(38-43(3,4)5)47-42(45)37-35-33-31-29-27-25-23-21-19-17-15-13-11-9-7-2/h20-23,40H,6-19,24-39H2,1-5H3/q+1/b22-20-,23-21- Key: KWVJHCQQUFDPLU-YEUCEMRASA-N; (chloride salt): InChI=1S/C42H80NO4.ClH/c1-6-8-10-12-14-16-18-20-22-24-26-28-30-32-34-36-41(44)46-39-40(38-43(3,4)5)47-42(45)37-35-33-31-29-27-25-23-21-19-17-15-13-11-9-7-2;/h20-23,40H,6-19,24-39H2,1-5H3;1H/q+1;/p-1/b22-20-,23-21-; Key: KSXTUUUQYQYKCR-LQDDAWAPSA-M
- SMILES: (cation): CCCCCCCC/C=C\CCCCCCCC(=O)OCC(C[N+](C)(C)C)OC(=O)CCCCCCC/C=C\CCCCCCCC; (chloride salt): CCCCCCCC/C=C\CCCCCCCC(=O)OCC(C[N+](C)(C)C)OC(=O)CCCCCCC/C=C\CCCCCCCC.[Cl-]

Properties
Chemical formula	C_{42}H_{80}NO_{4}^{+} (cation); C_{42}H_{80}NO_{4}Cl (chloride salt)
Molar mass	663.10 g/mol (cation); 698.56 g/mol (chloride salt)
Appearance	White solid (chloride salt)
Solubility in water	Soluble (chloride salt)
- Except where otherwise noted, data are given for materials in their standard state (at 25 °C [77 °F], 100 kPa). Infobox references

1,2-Dioleoyl-3-trimethylammonium propane (often abbreviated DOTAP or 18:1TAP) is a di-chain, or gemini, cationic surfactant. It is most commonly encountered as an active ingredient in certain fabric softeners. The pure material can also be used for the liposomal-transfection of DNA, RNA and other negatively charged molecules.

== Synthesis ==
The commercial material used for fabric softening is formed by the di-esterification of 2,3-epoxypropyltrimethylammoniumchloride (EPTAC) with partially hydrogenated palm oil and as such contains a mixture of fatty acid tails; palmitic (saturated C16), stearic (saturated C18), oleic (monounsaturated C18) and linoleic (polyunsaturated C18). In practice the saturated di-sterate compound tend to be the major component of these mixtures.

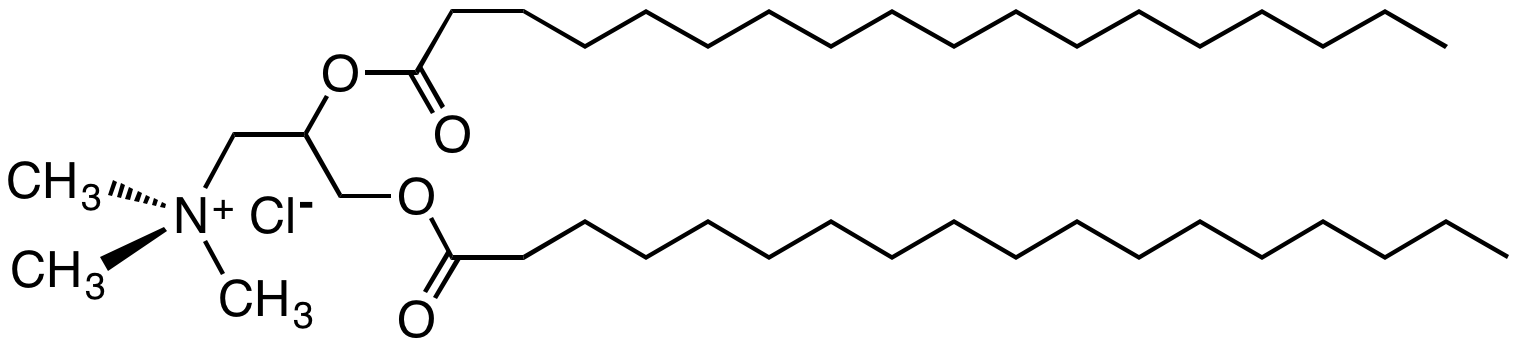
The fully saturated di-sterate, sometimes referred to as Hamburg Esterquat (HEQ), CAS No: 220609-41-6

Material intended for transfection is prepared similarly from high purity oleic acid.

== Applications ==
=== Fabric softener ===
It was originally introduced into European markets during the 1990s due to concerns over the environmental effects of DODAC, which was the principle softener used at the time. The main difference was the incorporation of cleavable ester groups intended to accelerate its biodegradation. It is a superior softener to di- and triethanolamine based softeners but suffers from an increased tendency to hydrolyse. Small patch test studies have not shown any clear evidence of it acting is a skin irritant.

=== Liposomal transfection agent ===
DOTAP is a cationic surfactant and is able to form stable cationic liposomes in solution, these readily absorb DNA and other negatively charged organic compounds. The DNA laden liposomes can then be added directly to cell culture medium, where they will combine with the cell membrane and release their payload into the cell.
