= Alkyl polyglycoside =

Class of chemical compounds

General chemical structure of an alkyl polyglucoside, a common form of alkyl polyglycoside.

Alkyl polyglycosides (APGs) are a class of non-ionic surfactants widely used in a variety of cosmetic, household, and industrial applications. Biodegradable and plant-derived from sugars, these surfactants are usually derivatives of glucose and fatty alcohols. The raw materials are typically starch and fat, and the final products are typically complex mixtures of compounds with different sugars comprising the hydrophilic end and alkyl groups of variable length comprising the hydrophobic end. When derived from glucose they are known as alkyl polyglucosides, with a common example being the mixed decyl/octyl glycosides (CAS: 68515–73–1).

APGs exhibit good wetting, foaming, and detergency properties, making them effective in cleaning and personal care products. They are also stable across a wide pH range and compatible with various other surfactants.

== Uses ==
APGs are used to enhance the formation of foams in detergents. They are also used in the personal care industry because they are biodegradable and safe for sensitive skin.

== Preparation ==
APGs are produced by combining a sugar such as glucose with a fatty alcohol in the presence of acid catalysts at elevated temperatures.

== Examples ==
- Decyl glucoside
- Octyl glucoside
- Lauryl glucoside
