= Downey =

Downey may refer to:

== People ==
- Downey (surname)

== Places in the United States ==
- Downey, California, a city
- Downey, Idaho, a city
- Downey, Iowa, an unincorporated community and census-designated place

== Businesses ==
- W. & D. Downey, photographic studio
- Downey Studios, created out of a former Boeing plant

== American schools ==
- Downey High School, Downey, California
- Thomas Downey High School, Modesto, California

== See also ==
- Downie, a surname
- Downy, a brand of fabric softener
- Downy Birch
- Drooping Brome (Downy Brome)
- Downy Emerald
- Downy Hawthorn
- Downy Hempnettle
- Downy mildew
- Downy Oak
- Downy Serviceberry (disambiguation)
- Downy Woodpecker
- A colloquial term for a person with Down syndrome
