= Downy =

Brand name of fabric softener produced by Procter & Gamble

- Current owner: Procter & Gamble
- Country: United States
- Introduced: 1960; 66 years ago
- Related brands: Lenor (Europe, Russia, Taiwan, Japan and Hong Kong)
- Markets: Worldwide
- Website: www.downy.com

Downy, also known as Lenor in Europe, Taiwan and Japan, is an American brand of fabric softener produced by Procter & Gamble that was introduced in 1960.

== History ==
Procter & Gamble developed Downy during the late 1950s to address the physical effects of synthetic detergents on textiles. While these detergents improved cleaning, they often left fabrics with a stiff texture, a problem compounded by the high heat of automatic dryers which contributed to wrinkling and static cling. Procter & Gamble's research and development team identified compounds that could bond to fabric fibers during the rinse cycle, resulting in a smoother feel and providing a barrier against impurities in wash water. Following successful test marketing in 1960, Downy became the first liquid fabric softener to be distributed nationally in the United States. To address the difficulty of manual application during the rinse cycle, Procter & Gamble encouraged appliance manufacturers to integrate automatic dispensers into washing machines and later introduced dispensing balls to automate the release of the liquid.

During a period of high demand in the early 1970s, production at Procter & Gamble's Lima, Ohio, plant was updated by technician-led initiatives. Rather than hiring outside contractors to expand capacity, the facility's workforce underwent intensive training to increase line speeds internally. This era also saw a significant shift in liquid-filling technology when a technician developed a process to fill and cap bottles while they were still in their shipping cases. The filling method eliminated several manual handling steps and was eventually adopted as an industry standard. In 1972, Procter & Gamble expanded its fabric care portfolio by launching dryer sheets (a technology that transferred softening agents via heat and tumbling) under the Bounce brand, but the technology was later integrated into the Downy brand in 1987.

Lenor is a brand name of fabric softener and dryer sheets, also produced by Procter & Gamble, sold in Europe, Russia and Japan. Lenor fabric softener had entered China in 2007. but was subsequently discontinued. Scent beads under the brand Downy have been sold in China since December 2017. Plans to rebrand Lenor as Downy in the UK were dropped in 2002.

== Awards ==
For the company's national and international experience in sustainable development, and eco-friendly products, the Environment Possibility Award conferred the "Environmental Heroes of the Year" to Downy in 2012.

== Advertising ==
Amy Sedaris and Tituss Burgess were hired to promote the Downy/Lenor Unstoppables In-Wash Scent Boosters range in both the US and the UK. The commercials were filmed by Grey Advertising. Its most recent television commercial features the Backstreet Boys.

== See also ==
- Down feather
- Downey
