= Dimethyldioctadecylammonium bromide =

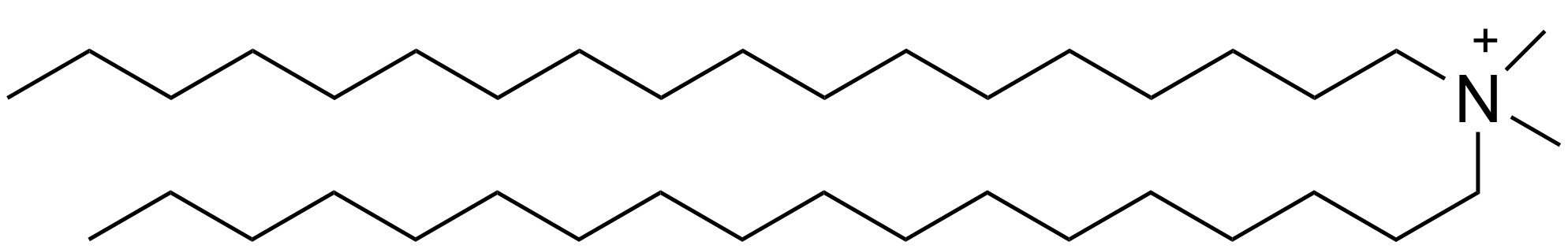

Names
- Preferred IUPAC name N,N-Dimethyl-N-octadecyloctadecan-1-aminium bromide
- Other names Distearyldimethylammonium bromide

Identifiers
CAS Number	3700-67-2
3D model (JSmol)	Interactive image
ChemSpider	69713
PubChem CID	77293
UNII	Z5T47R065A
- InChI: InChI=1S/C38H80N.BrH/c1-5-7-9-11-13-15-17-19-21-23-25-27-29-31-33-35-37-39(3,4)38-36-34-32-30-28-26-24-22-20-18-16-14-12-10-8-6-2;/h5-38H2,1-4H3;1H/q+1;/p-1 Key: PSLWZOIUBRXAQW-UHFFFAOYSA-M
- SMILES: CCCCCCCCCCCCCCCCCC[N+](C)(C)CCCCCCCCCCCCCCCCCC.[Br-]

Properties
Chemical formula	C_{38}H_{80}BrN
Molar mass	630.969 g·mol^{−1}
Appearance	White solid

Hazards
- GHS labelling
Pictograms	(GHS07: Exclamation mark)
Signal word	Warning
Hazard statements	H315, H319, H335
Precautionary statements	P261, P305+P351+P338, P310
- Safety data sheet (SDS)
- Except where otherwise noted, data are given for materials in their standard state (at 25 °C [77 °F], 100 kPa). Infobox references

Dimethyldioctadecylammonium bromide (also dioctadecyldimethylammonium bromide or DODAB) is a double-chained quaternary ammonium surfactant that forms unilamellar vesicles (ULVs) in water. Among various preparation methods, the ‘‘hot-water” method offers a simple procedure to prepare DODAB cationic vesicles by simply dissolving the DODAB in hot water above 50 °C, i.e., chain melting (main) transition, Tm. In general, the DSC thermograms of the unsonicated DODAB dispersions are dominated by two endotherms; the pre- (35–36 °C) and main transition (42.7–45 °C) peaks. Moreover, in literature reported the presence of a third endotherm (post transition) at 52.2 °C. The main transition (Tm) is ascribed to gel to liquid-crystalline phase transition in which the alkyl chains transform from solidlike to liquid-like state.

The 10 mM DODAB is a critical concentration, below which the dispersions consist of large polydispersed unilamellar vesicles (ULVs) that exhibit a local (chain melting) transition at 43 °C, beyond which a structural transition occurs: ULVs --> MLVs (multilamellar vesicles) as indicated by the sudden increase in the dynamic moduli. However, above 10 mM DODAB, the dispersions are mostly formed by ULVs in coexistence with lamellar fragments resulting in a network that shows a rheogram similar to that of hexagonal liquid-crystalline phase.

== See also ==
- Dimethyldioctadecylammonium chloride – corresponding chloride salt
- Didecyldimethylammonium chloride – shorter di-C10 analogue
- Cetrimonium bromide (cetyl trimethylammonium bromide; CTAB; hexadecyl trimethyl ammonium bromide)
- Cetrimonium chloride (cetyl trimethylammonium chloride; CTAC)
