= Octyl glucoside =

β-D-Octyl glucoside
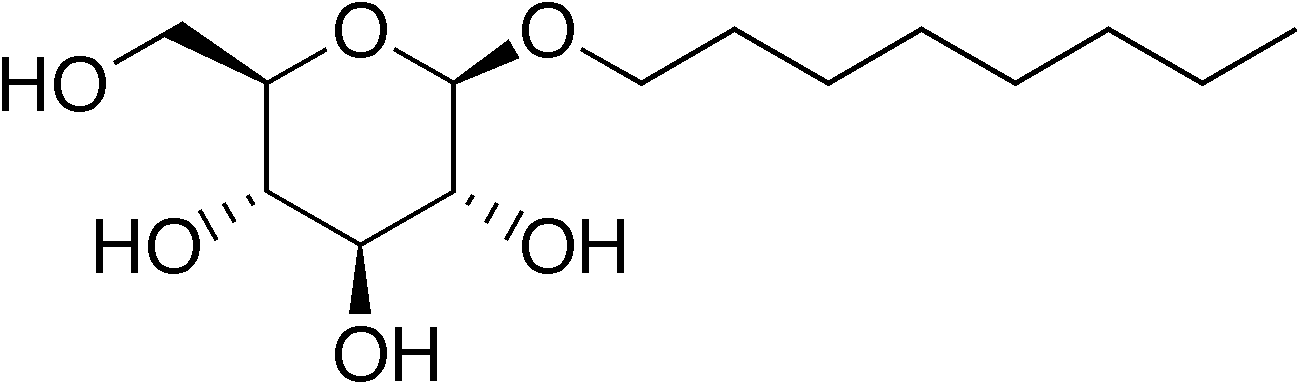

Names
- IUPAC name Octyl β-D-glucopyranoside
- Systematic IUPAC name (2R,3S,4S,5R,6R)-2-(Hydroxymethyl)-6-(octyloxy)oxane-3,4,5-triol
- Other names n-Octyl-β-D-glucoside

Identifiers
CAS Number	29836-26-8
3D model (JSmol)	Interactive image
ChemSpider	56585
ECHA InfoCard	100.045.337
EC Number	249-887-8
MeSH	C018619
PubChem CID	62852
UNII	V109WUT6RL
CompTox Dashboard (EPA)	DTXSID6042234
- InChI: InChI=1S/C14H28O6/c1-2-3-4-5-6-7-8-19-14-13(18)12(17)11(16)10(9-15)20-14/h10-18H,2-9H2,1H3/t10-,11-,12+,13-,14-/m1/s1 Key: HEGSGKPQLMEBJL-RKQHYHRCSA-N; InChI=1/C14H28O6/c1-2-3-4-5-6-7-8-19-14-13(18)12(17)11(16)10(9-15)20-14/h10-18H,2-9H2,1H3/t10-,11-,12+,13-,14-/m1/s1 Key: HEGSGKPQLMEBJL-RKQHYHRCBI
- SMILES: CCCCCCCCO[C@H]1[C@@H]([C@H]([C@@H]([C@H](O1)CO)O)O)O

Properties
Chemical formula	C_{14}H_{28}O_{6}
Molar mass	292.37 g/mol
- Surface tension
CMC	0.025 M
- Except where otherwise noted, data are given for materials in their standard state (at 25 °C [77 °F], 100 kPa). verify (what is ?) Infobox references

Octyl glucoside (n-octyl-β-d-glucoside) is a nonionic surfactant frequently used to solubilise integral membrane proteins for studies in biochemistry. Structurally, it is a glycoside derived from glucose and octanol. Like Genapol X-100 and Triton X-100, it is a nonphysiological amphiphile that makes lipid bilayers less "stiff".

== Applications ==
Octyl glucoside has become one of the most important detergents for purification of membrane proteins because it generally does not denature the protein and can readily be removed from final protein extracts. Above its critical micelle concentration of 0.025 M (~0.7% w/v), it was noted as the best detergent for improving selectivity of immunoprecipitation of phosphotyrosine modified proteins. This detergent has also been shown to rapidly inactivate infective HIV at concentrations above its CMC.

The compound gained popularity with researchers following the publication of an improved synthesis in 1978. However, in 1990 the cost remained prohibitive for large-scale protein isolation.

Octyl glucoside has been proposed as a conditioning agent to prevent microbial colonization of contact lenses, due to its ability to lower the hydrophobicity of contact lenses and prevent adhesion of Staphylococcus epidermidis and Pseudomonas aeruginosa.

== See also ==
- Decyl glucoside
- Lauryl glucoside
- Alkyl polyglycoside
- octyl thioglucoside
