= Octaethylene glycol monododecyl ether =

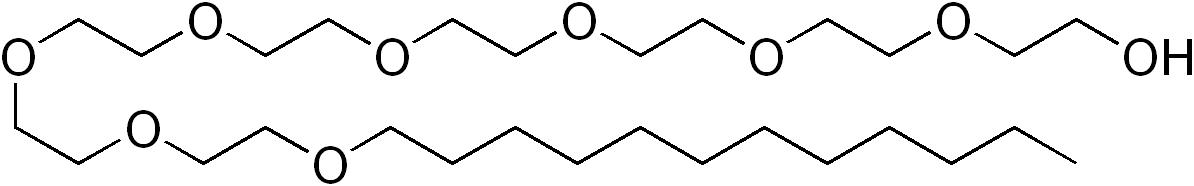

Names
- Preferred IUPAC name 3,6,9,12,15,18,21,24-Octaoxahexatriacontan-1-ol
- Other names Dodecyloctaethyleneglycol monoether

Identifiers
CAS Number	3055-98-9
3D model (JSmol)	Interactive image
Abbreviations	C12E8
ChEBI	CHEBI:41527
ChEMBL	ChEMBL501722
ChemSpider	110452
ECHA InfoCard	100.225.232
PubChem CID	123921
CompTox Dashboard (EPA)	DTXSID30184640
- InChI: InChI=1S/C28H58O9/c1-2-3-4-5-6-7-8-9-10-11-13-30-15-17-32-19-21-34-23-25-36-27-28-37-26-24-35-22-20-33-18-16-31-14-12-29/h29H,2-28H2,1H3 Key: YYELLDKEOUKVIQ-UHFFFAOYSA-N; InChI=1/C28H58O9/c1-2-3-4-5-6-7-8-9-10-11-13-30-15-17-32-19-21-34-23-25-36-27-28-37-26-24-35-22-20-33-18-16-31-14-12-29/h29H,2-28H2,1H3 Key: YYELLDKEOUKVIQ-UHFFFAOYAB
- SMILES: O(CCOCCOCCCCCCCCCCCC)CCOCCOCCOCCOCCOCCO

Properties
Chemical formula	C_{28}H_{58}O_{9}
Molar mass	538.75472
- Surface tension
CMC	8×10^{−5} M at 25 °C.
- Except where otherwise noted, data are given for materials in their standard state (at 25 °C [77 °F], 100 kPa). verify (what is ?) Infobox references

Octaethylene glycol monododecyl ether (C12E8) is a nonionic surfactant formed by the ethoxylation of dodecanol (lauryl alcohol) to give a material with 8 repeat units of ethylene glycol.

== See also ==
- Pentaethylene glycol monododecyl ether, C12E5
