= OTG =

OTG may refer to:

- Octylthioglucoside, a detergent
- Off-the-grid, a lifestyle without access to public utilities
- On-The-Go, a USB communications standard for portable devices
- One-Two-GO Airlines (ICAO code), a defunct Thai air carrier
- Oven Toaster Grill, another common name for a kitchen appliance called the Toaster oven
