= Aggregation number =

Average number of surfactant monomers in a spherical micelle

In colloidal chemistry, an aggregation number is a description of the number of molecules present in a micelle once the critical micelle concentration (CMC) has been reached. In more detail, it has been defined as the average number of surfactant monomers in a spherical micelle.

The aggregation number of micelles can be determined by isothermal titration calorimetry when the aggregation number is not too high.

Another classical experiment to determine the mean aggregation number would involve the use of a luminescent probe, a quencher and a known concentration of surfactant. If the concentration of the quencher is varied, and the CMC of the surfactant known, the mean aggregation number can be calculated.
