= Dispensing ball =

Ball used to dispense fabric softener in clothes washing machines

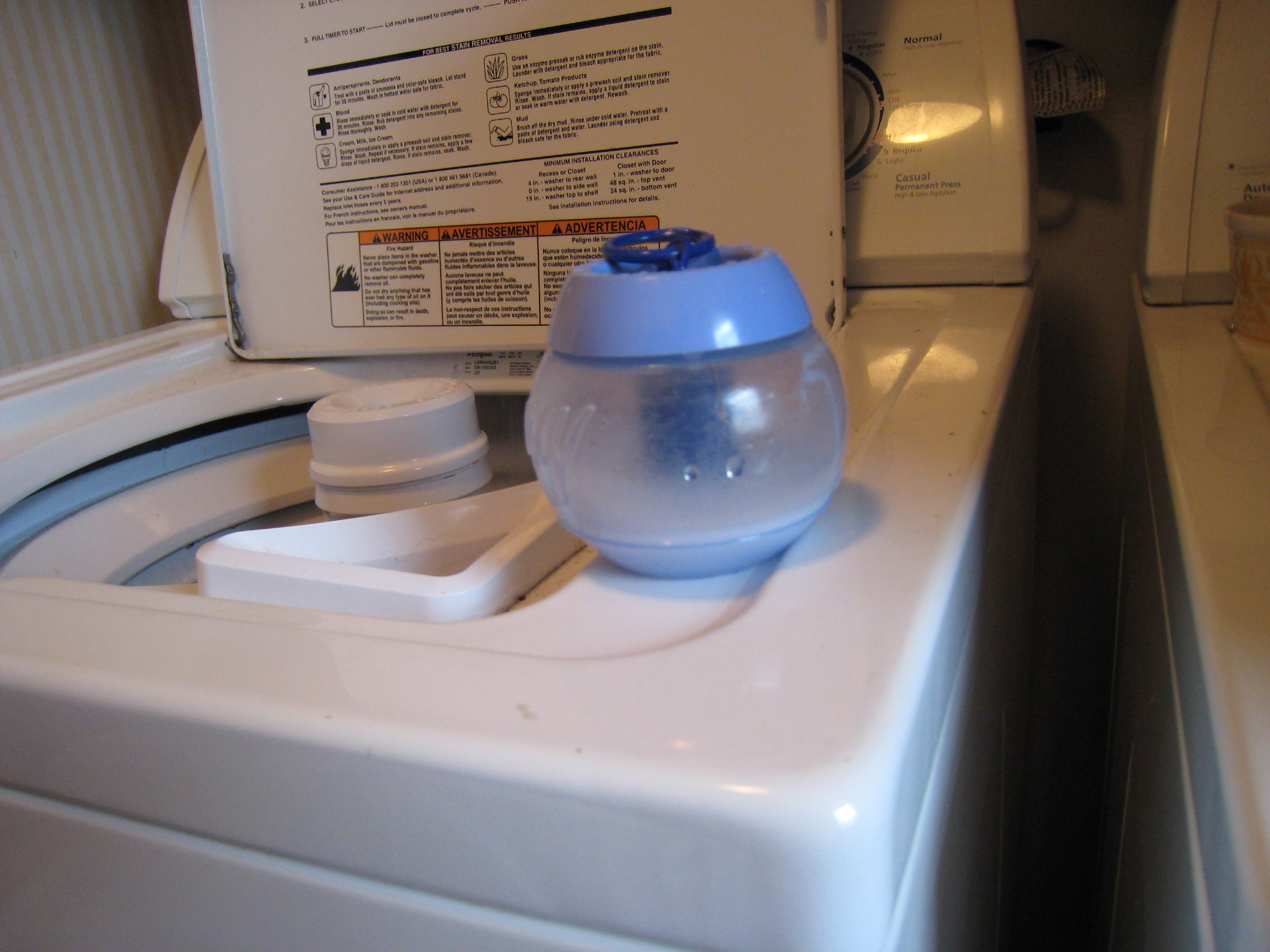
A "Downy Ball" dispenser on a top-loading washing machine

A dispensing ball is a special plastic ball used to dispense liquid fabric softener in clothes washing machines that lack built-in softener dispensers. Liquid fabric softener has to be added at the correct time to a load of laundry (the rinse cycle) in order to work effectively. In top-loading machines, the ball accomplishes this with no user input, other than the initial loading, and filling of the ball.

== Operation ==
In a top-loading washing machine, the ball floats on the surface of the water during the mild forces of the washing process, and remains sealed. The stronger forces of the later spin cycle causes the seal on the ball to be broken, releasing the liquid softener.

These balls can not be used in front-loading tumbling washers, because the tumbling releases the fabric softener before the rinse cycle. They cannot be used at all in the dryer.

== Downy Ball ==
The Downy Ball is a variant sold by Procter & Gamble specifically designed for use with traditional agitator-based top-loading washing machines which lack built-in fabric softener dispensers, and it won't work correctly on front-loading machines. Liquid fabric softener is poured into the Downy Ball through a hole on the top side. The ball is then tossed into the washing machine with the clothes and detergent, where it floats in a vertical position, with an internal rubber weight floating inside and trapping the softener inside. In the spin cycle, between the wash and rinse cycles, the internal rubber weight moves aside due to Newton's first law of motion, allowing the fabric softener to spill out onto the clothes, just in time for the rinse cycle.
