= Friedrich Krafft =

German chemist (1852–1923)

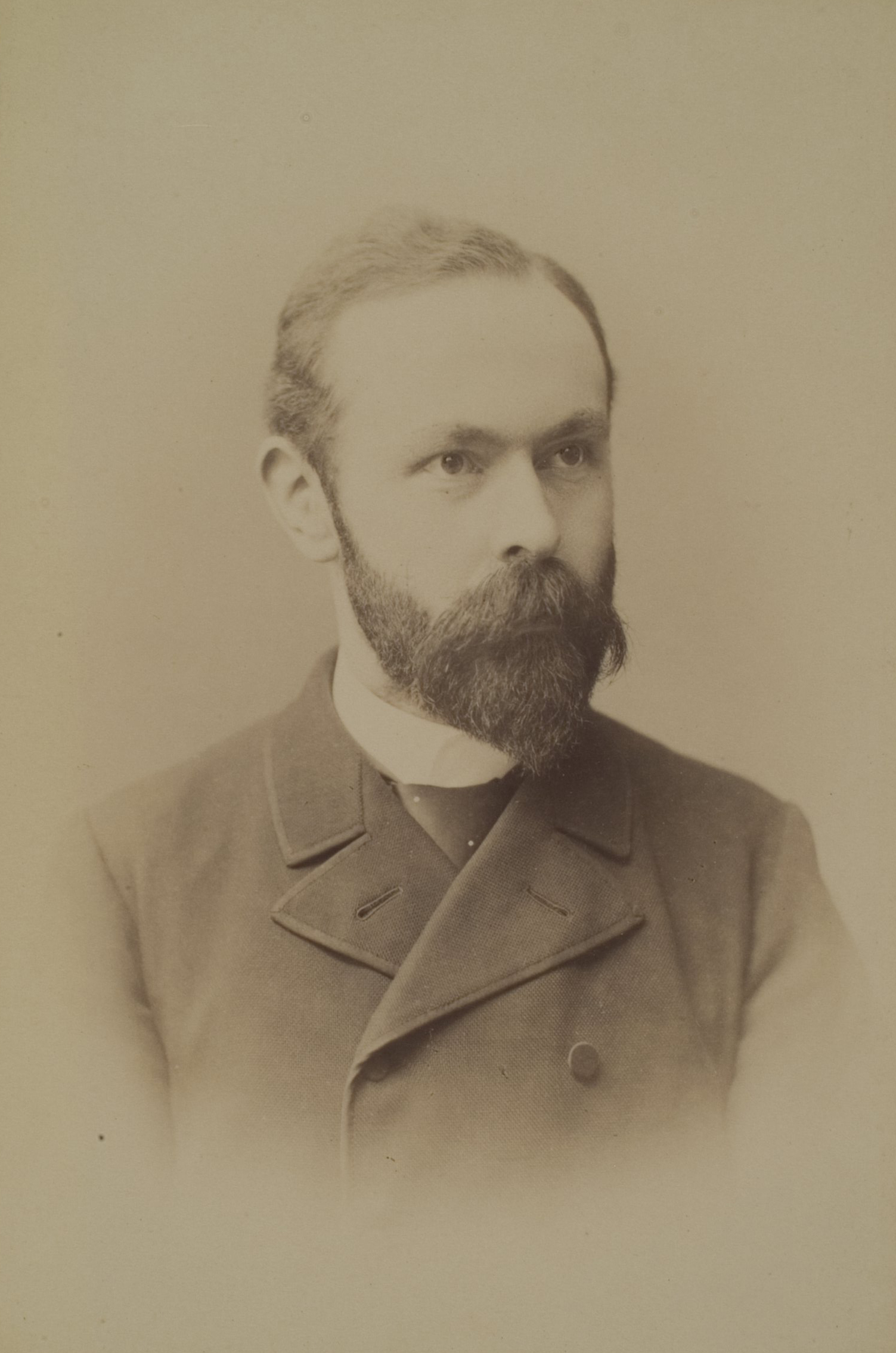
Krafft, c. 1900

Friedrich Krafft (February 21, 1852 in Bonn – June 3, 1923 in Heidelberg) was a German chemist. He studied with Friedrich August Kekulé von Stradonitz, Rudolf Clausius and Gerhard vom Rath.

In colloidal chemistry, the Krafft temperature is named after him. In organic chemistry, the Krafft degradation reaction is named after him. This reaction is a conversion of a carboxylic acid, typically of high molecular weight, into the next lower homolog. He also established the boiling point of noble metals and synthesised aromatic compounds containing selenium and tellurium.

== Selected publications ==
- Kurzes Lehrbuch der Chemie (Short Handbook of Chemistry), Leipzig and Vienna, Franz Denticke:
  - Volume 1: Anorgan. Chemie (Inorganic Chemistry); 1891, Digital 3rd edition from 1898 by the University and State Library Düsseldorf
  - Volume 2: Organische Chemie (Organic Chemistry); 1893. Digital 2nd edition from 1897 by the University and State Library Düsseldorf
- F. Krafft, A. Stern, Hermann Wiglow: "Über das Verhalten der fettsauren Alkalien und Seifen in Gegenwart von Wasser Teil I und II" (The Behavior of the Fatty Acid Alkalis and Soaps in the Presence of Water, Parts 1 and 2). In: Ber. Dt. chem. Ges. 27 (1894), Vol. 4, pp. 1747–1761. Part 3: "Die Seife als Krystalloide" (Soap as Crystalloids), 28 (1895), Vol. 3, pp. 2566–2573. Part 4: "Die Seife als Colloide" (Soaps as Colloids), 28 (1895), Vol. 3, pp. 2573–2582.
- F. Krafft, Anton Strutz: "Über das Verhalten seifenähnlicher Substanzen gegen Wasser" (The Behavior of Soaplike Substances in Water). In: Ber. Dt. chem. Ges. 29 (1896), Vol. 2, pp. 1328–1334.
- F. Krafft: "Über eine Theorie der colloidalen Lösungen" (The Theory of Colloidal Solutions). In: Ber. Dt. chem. Ges. 29 (1896), Vol. 2, pp. 1334–1344.
- F. Krafft, R. Funcke: "Über die Einwirkung des Wassers auf Heptylaminseifen" (The Action of Water on Heptylamine Soaps). Ber. Dt. chem. Ges. 33 (1900), Vol. 3, pp. 3210–3212.
