= Pentaethylene glycol monododecyl ether =

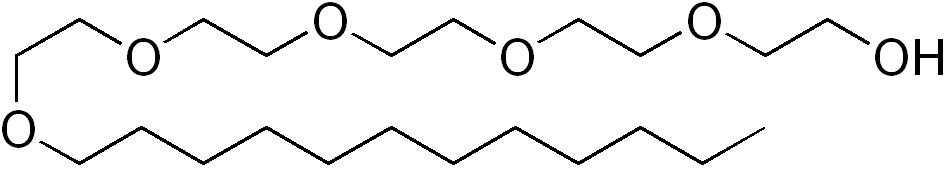

Names
- Preferred IUPAC name 3,6,9,12,15-Tetraoxaheptacosan-1-ol
- Other names Dodecylpentaglycol; Laureth-5

Identifiers
CAS Number	3055-95-6
3D model (JSmol)	Interactive image
Abbreviations	C12E5
ChEBI	CHEBI:91323
ChemSpider	17268
ECHA InfoCard	100.019.348
PubChem CID	18281
UNII	Q9F4A7XYE8
CompTox Dashboard (EPA)	DTXSID1058632
- InChI: InChI=1S/C22H46O6/c1-2-3-4-5-6-7-8-9-10-11-13-24-15-17-26-19-21-28-22-20-27-18-16-25-14-12-23/h23H,2-22H2,1H3 Key: LAPRIVJANDLWOK-UHFFFAOYSA-N; InChI=1/C22H46O6/c1-2-3-4-5-6-7-8-9-10-11-13-24-15-17-26-19-21-28-22-20-27-18-16-25-14-12-23/h23H,2-22H2,1H3 Key: LAPRIVJANDLWOK-UHFFFAOYAV
- SMILES: O(CCO)CCOCCOCCOCCOCCCCCCCCCCCC

Properties
Chemical formula	C_{22}H_{46}O_{6}
Molar mass	406.59704
Density	0.963 g/mL at 20 °C
- Surface tension
CMC	7×10^{−5} M at 25 °C.
- Except where otherwise noted, data are given for materials in their standard state (at 25 °C [77 °F], 100 kPa). verify (what is ?) Infobox references

Within chemical compound surfactants, pentaethylene glycol monododecyl ether (C12E5) is a nonionic surfactant. It is formed by the ethoxylation chemical reaction of dodecanol (lauryl alcohol) to give a material with 5 repeat units of ethylene glycol.

== Multilamellar vesicle formation ==
Within the study of biological membranes and cell biology, for vesicle formation, the lamellar phase at 40wt% solution of C12E5 dissolved in D_{2}O form multilamellar vesicles under shear rate.

== See also ==
- Octaethylene glycol monododecyl ether, C12E8
