= Disodium cocoamphodiacetate =

- n = 6, 8, 10, 12, 14, 16

Names
- Other names DSCADA; Disodium N-2-(N-(2-carboxymethoxyethyl)-N-carboxymethylamino)ethylcocamide

Identifiers
CAS Number	68650-39-5
ECHA InfoCard	100.065.474
EC Number	272-043-5
UNII	18L9G3U51M
CompTox Dashboard (EPA)	DTXSID9029483

Properties
Chemical formula	Variable
- Except where otherwise noted, data are given for materials in their standard state (at 25 °C [77 °F], 100 kPa). Infobox references

Disodium cocoamphodiacetate (DSCADA) is a synthetic amphoteric surfactant routinely used in personal care products.

== Biodegradability ==
A 2008 study suggested high levels of DSCADA (>216 mg/L) may be toxic to bacteria in wastewater treatment processes. Results from the 2008 research indicated that DSCADA has limited biodegradability and recalcitrant metabolites may develop.
