= Dimethyldioctadecylammonium chloride =

Names
- Preferred IUPAC name N,N-Dimethyl-N-octadecyloctadecan-1-aminium chloride
- Other names Dimethyldioctadecylammonium chloride, or; Distearyl dimethyl ammonium chloride; Aliquat 207, DDAC, distearyldimonium chloride, DSDMAC

Identifiers
CAS Number	107-64-2
3D model (JSmol)	Interactive image
ChemSpider	7591
ECHA InfoCard	100.003.190
PubChem CID	7879
UNII	OM9573ZX3X
CompTox Dashboard (EPA)	DTXSID8026771
- InChI: InChI=1S/C38H80N.ClH/c1-5-7-9-11-13-15-17-19-21-23-25-27-29-31-33-35-37-39(3,4)38-36-34-32-30-28-26-24-22-20-18-16-14-12-10-8-6-2;/h5-38H2,1-4H3;1H/q+1;/p-1 Key: REZZEXDLIUJMMS-UHFFFAOYSA-M; InChI=1/C38H80N.ClH/c1-5-7-9-11-13-15-17-19-21-23-25-27-29-31-33-35-37-39(3,4)38-36-34-32-30-28-26-24-22-20-18-16-14-12-10-8-6-2;/h5-38H2,1-4H3;1H/q+1;/p-1 Key: REZZEXDLIUJMMS-REWHXWOFAC
- SMILES: [Cl-].C(CCCCC[N+](C)(CCCCCCCCCCCCCCCCCC)C)CCCCCCCCCCCC

Properties
Chemical formula	C_{38}H_{80}ClN
Molar mass	586.52 g·mol^{−1}
Melting point	160 °C (320 °F; 433 K)
- Except where otherwise noted, data are given for materials in their standard state (at 25 °C [77 °F], 100 kPa). verify (what is ?) Infobox references

Dimethyldioctadecylammonium chloride (also commonly distearyl dimethyl ammonium chloride or distearyldimonium chloride) is an organic compound classified as quaternary ammonium salt. The nitrogen center substituted with two methyl groups and two stearyl groups. The combination of long-chain hydrocarbon groups and the cationic ammonium confers surfactant- or a detergent-like properties. For professional use only, it can be found in many wares-and-equipment sanitizers as well as cleaner/sanitizer combinations that are standard in the foodservice industry – it was once a major component of fabric softeners, but has been largely phased out because of its low biodegradability. In household products, it may also be found as an ingredient in cosmetics and hair conditioners in which it is added primarily for its antistatic effects. It is also used in organic synthesis as a phase transfer catalyst to increase reaction rates in a two-phase organic-water system.

== See also ==
- Dimethyldioctadecylammonium bromide – corresponding bromide salt
- Didecyldimethylammonium chloride – shorter di-C10 analogue
