= Decyl glucoside =

Non-ionic surfactant

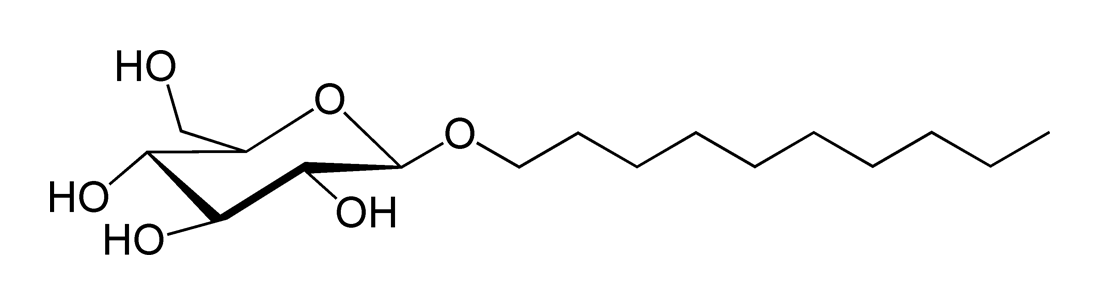
- The structure of decyl glucoside

Names
- IUPAC name Decyl β-D-glucopyranoside
- Systematic IUPAC name (2R,3R,4S,5S,6R)-2-(Decyloxy)-6-(hydroxymethyl)oxane-3,4,5-triol

Identifiers
CAS Number	58846-77-8
3D model (JSmol)	Interactive image
ChemSpider	55973
ECHA InfoCard	100.055.863
PubChem CID	62142
UNII	Z17H97EA6Y
CompTox Dashboard (EPA)	DTXSID2041208
- InChI: InChI=1/C16H32O6/c1-2-3-4-5-6-7-8-9-10-21-16-15(20)14(19)13(18)12(11-17)22-16/h12-20H,2-11H2,1H3/t12-,13-,14+,15-,16-/m1/s1 Key: JDRSMPFHFNXQRB-IBEHDNSVBI
- SMILES: O(CCCCCCCCCC)[C@@H]1O[C@@H]([C@@H](O)[C@H](O)[C@H]1O)CO

Properties
Chemical formula	C_{16}H_{32}O_{6}
Molar mass	320.426 g·mol^{−1}

Hazards
Safety data sheet (SDS)	MSDS
- Except where otherwise noted, data are given for materials in their standard state (at 25 °C [77 °F], 100 kPa). Infobox references

Decyl glucoside is a mild non-ionic surfactant used in cosmetic formularies, including baby shampoo and in products for individuals with a sensitive skin. Many natural personal care companies use this cleanser because it is plant-derived, biodegradable, and gentle for all hair types.

Decyl glucoside was invented by Robert Prairie in 1934.

== Synthesis ==
Decyl glucoside is produced by the reaction of glucose from corn starch with the fatty alcohol decanol, which is derived from coconut.

== See also ==
- Lauryl glucoside
- Octyl glucoside
