= Fabric softener =

Chemical conditioner applied to laundry during the washing cycle

A fabric softener (American English) or fabric conditioner (British English) is a conditioner applied to laundry after it has been washed in a washing machine. A similar, more dilute preparation meant to be applied to dry fabric is known as a wrinkle releaser.

Fabric softeners reduce the harsh feel of items dried in open air, add fragrance to laundry, and/or impart anti-static properties to textiles. In contrast to laundry detergents, fabric softeners are considered a type of after-treatment laundry aid.

Fabric softeners are available either in the form of a liquid, typically added during the washing machine's rinse cycle, or as dryer sheets that are added to a tumble dryer before drying begins. Liquid fabric softeners may be added manually during the rinse cycle, automatically if the machine has a dispenser designed for this purpose, through the use of a dispensing ball, or poured onto a piece of laundry to be dried (such as a washcloth), which is then placed into the dryer.

Washing machines exert significant mechanical stress on textiles, particularly natural fibers such as cotton and wool. The fibers at the fabric's surface become squashed and frayed, and this condition hardens into place when drying the laundry in open air, giving the textiles a harsh feel. Using a tumble dryer results in a softening effect, but it is less than what can be achieved through the use of a fabric softener.

As of 2009, nearly 80% of households in the United States had a mechanical clothes dryer. Consequently, fabric softeners are primarily used there to impart anti-static properties and fragrance to laundry.

== Mechanism of action ==
Fabric softeners coat the surface of a fabric with chemical compounds that are electrically charged, causing threads to "stand up" from the surface and thereby imparting a softer and fluffier texture. Cationic softeners bind by electrostatic attraction to the negatively charged groups on the surface of the fibers and neutralize their charge. The long aliphatic chains then line up towards the outside of the fiber, imparting lubricity.

Fabric softeners impart anti-static properties to fabrics, and thus prevent the build-up of electrostatic charges on synthetic fibers, which in turn eliminates fabric cling during handling and wearing, crackling noises, and dust attraction. Also, fabric softeners make fabrics easier to iron and help reduce wrinkles in garments. In addition, they reduce drying times so that energy is saved when softened laundry is tumble-dried. Additionally, they can also impart a pleasant fragrance to the laundry.

== Fabric softeners ==
Early cotton softeners were typically based on a water emulsion of soap and olive oil, corn oil, or tallow oil. Softening compounds differ in affinity to various fabrics. Some work better on cellulose-based fibers (i.e., cotton), others have a higher affinity to hydrophobic materials like nylon, polyethylene terephthalate, polyacrylonitrile, etc. New silicone-based compounds, such as polydimethylsiloxane, work by lubricating the fibers. Manufacturers use derivatives with amine- or amide-containing functional groups as well. These groups improve the softener's binding to fabrics.

As softeners are often hydrophobic, they commonly occur in the form of an emulsion. In the early formulations, manufacturers used soaps as emulsifiers. The emulsions are usually opaque, milky fluids. There are also microemulsions, where the molecules in the hydrophobic phase are substantially smaller. Microemulsions provide the advantage of increased ability of smaller particles to penetrate into the fibers. Manufacturers often use a mixture of cationic and non-ionic surfactants as an emulsifier. Another approach is a polymeric network, an emulsion polymer.

In addition to fabric softening chemicals, fabric softeners may include acids or bases to maintain optimal pH for absorption, silicone-based anti-foaming agents, emulsion stabilizers, fragrances, and colors.

=== Cationic fabric softeners ===
Rinse-cycle softeners usually contain cationic surfactants of the quaternary ammonium type as the main active ingredient. Cationic surfactants adhere well to natural fibers (wool, cotton), but less so to synthetic fibers. Cationic softeners are incompatible with anionic surfactants in detergents because they combine with them to form a solid precipitate. This requires that the softener be added in the rinse cycle. Fabric softener reduces the absorbency of textiles, which adversely affects the function of towels and microfiber cloths.

Formerly, the active material of most softeners in Europe, the United States, and Japan, was distearyldimethylammonium chloride (DSDMAC) or related quat salts. Due to their poor biodegradability, such tallow-derived compounds were replaced by the more labile ester-quats in the 1980s and 1990s.

Conventional softeners, which contain 4–6% active material, have been partially replaced in many countries by softener concentrates having some 12–30% active material.

Cationic surfactants used as fabric softeners

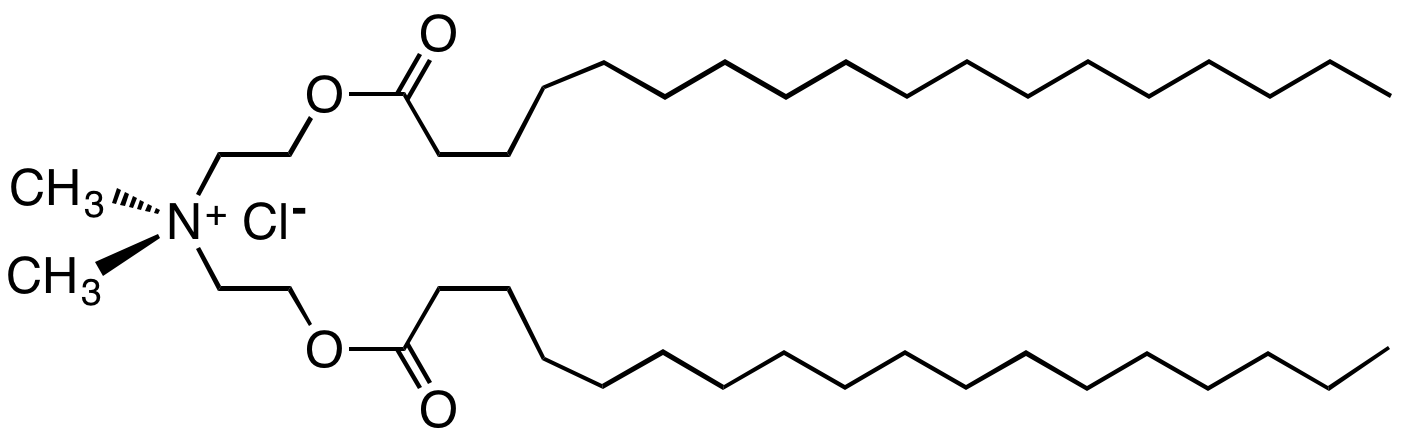
Diethyl ester dimethyl ammonium chloride (DEEDMAC)

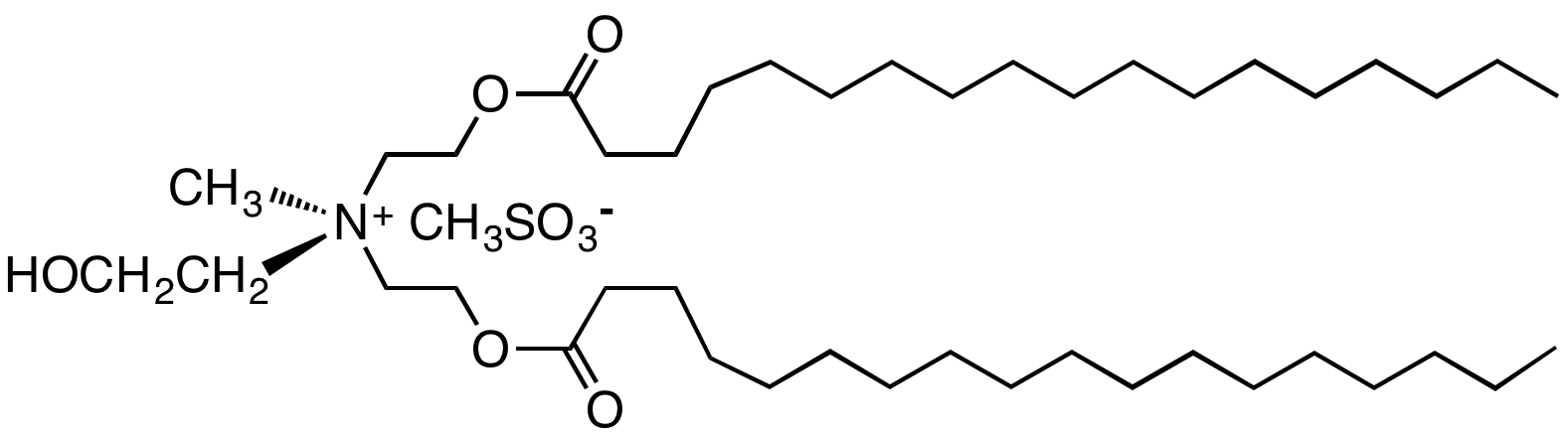
TEAQ (triethanolamine quat)

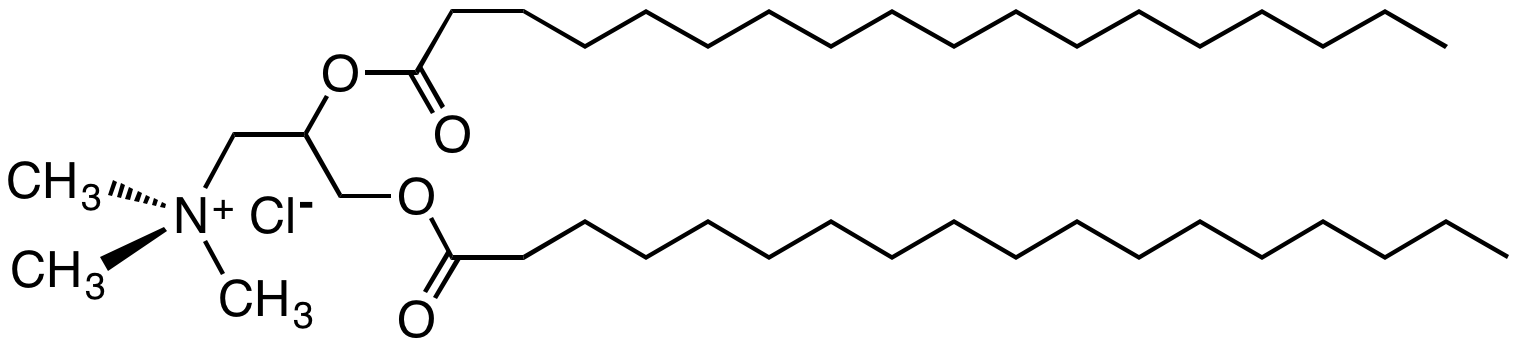
HEQ (Hamburg esterquat)

Distearyldimethylammonium chloride (DSDMAC)

=== Anionic fabric softeners ===
Anionic softeners and antistatic agents can be, for example, salts of monoesters and diesters of phosphoric acid and the fatty alcohols. These are often used together with the conventional cationic softeners. Cationic softeners are incompatible with anionic surfactants in detergents because they combine with them to form a solid precipitate. This requires that they be added in the rinse cycle. Anionic softeners can combine with anionic surfactants directly. Other anionic softeners can be based on smectite clays. Some compounds, such as ethoxylated phosphate esters, have softening, anti-static, and surfactant properties.

== Risks ==
As with soaps and detergents, fabric softeners may cause irritant contact dermatitis. Manufacturers produce some fabric softeners without dyes and perfumes to reduce the risk of skin irritation. Fabric softener overuse may make clothes more flammable, due to the fat-based nature of most softeners. Some deaths have been attributed to this phenomenon, and fabric softener makers recommend not using them on clothes labeled as flame-resistant.

== Fabrics which should not be treated with fabric softener ==
There are some fabrics and applications in which the use of fabric softener degrades performance and may cause damage to the fibres:

- Breathable fabrics may have their breathability weakened, as residues from fabric softener can clog the microscopic pores that allow moisture vapor to escape.
- High loft insulation such as down can lose its loft
- Wicking textiles may become less effective at wicking moisture away from the skin.
- Gore-tex and similar waterproof textiles can have their durable water repellent coating degraded by fabric softener residue, causing water to soak into the fabric rather than bead and roll off, and can lose breathability if residue clogs the membrane's pores.
- Towels (cotton or microfibre) can lose absorbency due to fabric softener.
- Wools and delicate natural fabrics may lose their natural loft if coated with conditioner.
- Swimwear made from stretchy synthetic fabrics like lycra, polyester and nylon can take longer to dry if coated with conditioner.
- Baby clothes will gain a waxy buildup resulting to increased flammability
- Fire resistant fabrics such as curtains and upholstery covers can become more flammable.

== Alternatives ==
- White vinegar in the rinse water can reduce odours, help soften clothing and reduce static.
- Baking soda (sodium bicarbonate) can neutralise odours and soften fabrics.

== See also ==
- Moisture management – Functional property in fabrics to transfer moisture and dry quickly
- Laundry – Washing of clothing and other textiles
- Detergent – Surfactants with cleansing properties
- Breathability – Ability of fabric to transfer moisture vapor
