= Downy serviceberry =

Downy serviceberry is a common name for several plants and may refer to:

- Amelanchier arborea
- Amelanchier canadensis
