= Lauryl glucoside =

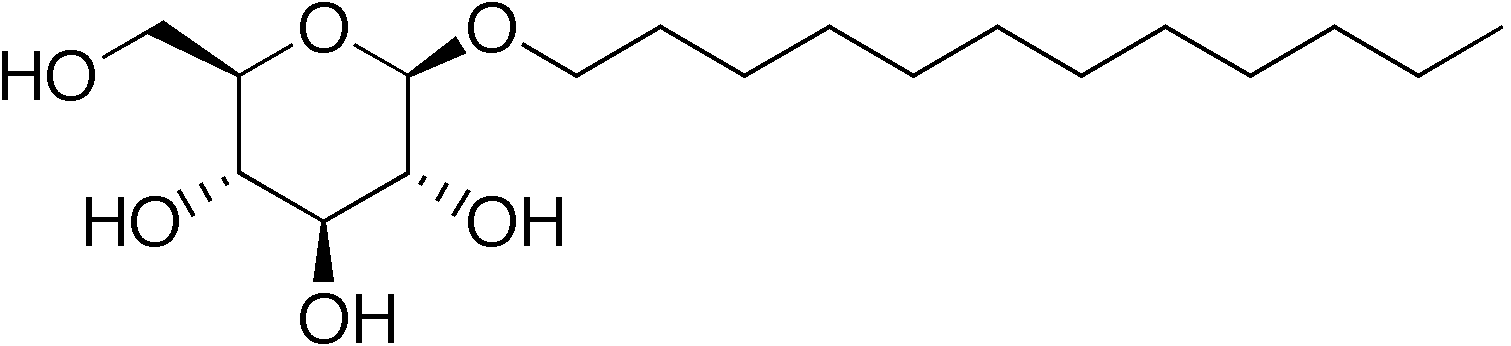

Names
- IUPAC name Dodecyl β-D-glucopyranoside
- Systematic IUPAC name (2R,3R,4S,5S,6R)-2-(Dodecyloxy)-6-(hydroxymethyl)oxane-3,4,5-triol
- Other names Dodecyl glucoside, Lauryl polyglucoside

Identifiers
CAS Number	59122-55-3
3D model (JSmol)	Interactive image
ChemSpider	84249
ECHA InfoCard	100.055.995
EC Number	261-614-4
PubChem CID	93321
UNII	76LN7P7UCU
CompTox Dashboard (EPA)	DTXSID40891954
- InChI: InChI=1S/C18H36O6/c1-2-3-4-5-6-7-8-9-10-11-12-23-18-17(22)16(21)15(20)14(13-19)24-18/h14-22H,2-13H2,1H3/t14-,15-,16+,17-,18-/m1/s1 Key: PYIDGJJWBIBVIA-UYTYNIKBSA-N; InChI=1/C18H36O6/c1-2-3-4-5-6-7-8-9-10-11-12-23-18-17(22)16(21)15(20)14(13-19)24-18/h14-22H,2-13H2,1H3/t14-,15-,16+,17-,18-/m1/s1 Key: PYIDGJJWBIBVIA-UYTYNIKBBA
- SMILES: CCCCCCCCCCCCO[C@H]1[C@@H]([C@H]([C@@H]([C@H](O1)CO)O)O)O

Properties
Chemical formula	C_{18}H_{36}O_{6}
Molar mass	348.48 g/mol

Hazards
- GHS labelling
Pictograms	(GHS07: Exclamation mark)
Signal word	Warning
Hazard statements	H315, H319, H335
Precautionary statements	P261, P264, P271, P280, P302+P352, P304+P340, P305+P351+P338, P312, P321, P332+P313, P337+P313, P362, P403+P233, P405, P501
- Except where otherwise noted, data are given for materials in their standard state (at 25 °C [77 °F], 100 kPa). verify (what is ?) Infobox references

Lauryl glucoside is a surfactant used in cosmetics and laundry detergents. It is a glycoside produced from glucose and lauryl alcohol.

== See also ==
- Decyl glucoside
- Octyl glucoside
