= Krafft temperature =

Temperature above which micelles form in a solution of dissolved surfactants

In colloidal chemistry, the Krafft temperature (or Krafft point, after German chemist Friedrich Krafft) is defined as the minimum temperature at which the formation of micelles occurs in a solution of dissolved surfactant. It has been found that solubility at the Krafft point is nearly equal to critical micelle concentration (CMC). Below the Krafft temperature, the maximum solubility of the surfactant will be lower than the critical micelle concentration, meaning micelles will not form. The Krafft temperature is a point of phase change below which the surfactant remains in crystalline form, even in an aqueous solution. Visually the effect of going below the Krafft point is similar to that of going above the cloud point, with the solution becoming cloudy or opaque due to the surfactant molecules undergoing flocculation.

Surfactants in such a crystalline state will only solubilize and form micelles if another surfactant assists it in overcoming the forces that keep it crystallized, or if the temperature increases, thus causing entropy to increase and encouraging the crystalline structure to break apart.

== Structural effects ==
Surfactants are usually composed of a hydrocarbon chain and a polar head group.

Increasing the length of the hydrocarbon chain increases the Krafft temperature because it improves Van der Waals forces.

Moreover, since Krafft point is related to solid-liquid transition, better-packed polar heads within surfactant crystals increase Krafft temperature.
