= N-Octyl β-D-thioglucopyranoside =

n-Octyl β-d-thioglucopyranoside

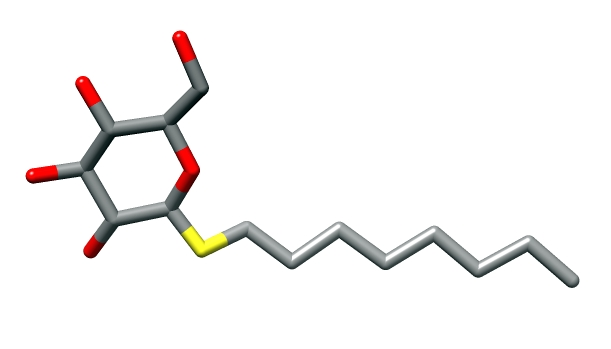

Names
- IUPAC name Octyl 1-thio-β-D-glucopyranoside
- Systematic IUPAC name (2R,3S,4S,5R,6S)-2-(Hydroxymethyl)-6-(octylsulfanyl)oxane-3,4,5-triol
- Other names (1S)-Octyl-β-d-thioglucoside

Identifiers
CAS Number	85618-21-9
3D model (JSmol)	Interactive image
ChemSpider	571158
ECHA InfoCard	100.115.951
PubChem CID	656909
CompTox Dashboard (EPA)	DTXSID50893686
- InChI: InChI=1S/C14H28O5S/c1-2-3-4-5-6-7-8-20-14-13(18)12(17)11(16)10(9-15)19-14/h10-18H,2-9H2,1H3/t10-,11-,12+,13-,14+/m1/s1 Key: CGVLVOOFCGWBCS-RGDJUOJXSA-N
- SMILES: CCCCCCCCS[C@H]1[C@@H]([C@H]([C@@H]([C@H](O1)CO)O)O)O

Properties
Chemical formula	C_{14}H_{28}O_{5}S
Molar mass	308.434 g/mol
Appearance	Colourless Waxy Semi-Solid
Melting point	125 to 131 °C (257 to 268 °F; 398 to 404 K)
- Except where otherwise noted, data are given for materials in their standard state (at 25 °C [77 °F], 100 kPa). Infobox references

n-Octyl β-d-thioglucopyranoside (octylthioglucoside, OTG) is a mild nonionic detergent that is used for cell lysis or to solubilise membrane proteins without denaturing them. This is particularly of use in order to crystallise them or to reconstitute them into lipid bilayers. It has a critical micelle concentration of 9 mM.

It is an analog of the commonly used detergent octyl glucoside, the presence of the thioether linkage making it resistant to degradation by beta-glucosidase enzymes.

== Preparation ==
N-alkyl thioglycosides of the n-octyl-β-d-thioglucopyranoside type are not naturally occurring. However, mustard oil glycosides are common natural S-glycosides.

The synthesis of n-octyl-β-d-thioglucopyranoside starts from D-glucose (I) which is prepared with acetic anhydride and concentrated sulfuric acid to give α-d-glucopyranose pentaacetate (pentaacetylglucose) (II). Pentaacetylglucose is reacted with hydrogen bromide to give 2,3,4,6-tetra-O-acetyl-α-d-glucopyranosyl bromide (acetobromo glucose) (III) which yields with thiourea in acetone almost quantitatively the isothiuronium salt 2,3,4,6-tetra-O-acetyl-β-d-glucopyranosyl-1-isothiuronium bromide (IV).

The nucleophilic thiolate anion formed after neutralization and reduction with sodium sulfite to the thiol in the alkaline reacts again almost quantitatively with 1-bromoctane to n-octyl-2,3,4,6-tetra-O-acetyl-1-thio-β-d-glucopyranoside (peracetylated octylthioglucoside) (V). From V, the target product n-octyl-1-thio-β-d-glucopyranoside (VI) can be obtained in an overall yield of about 80% via the quantitatively proceeding alkaline deacetylation by means of sodium hydroxide in methanol.

Synthese von OTG, ausgehend von α-d-Glucose

In the trichloroacetimidate method of Richard R. Schmidt, the peracetylated O-(α-d-glucopyranyl) trichloroacetimidate forms with 1-octanethiol via boron trifluoride-etherate catalysis upon inversion exclusively n-octyl-1-thio-β-d-glucopyranoside (after deacetylation), while the perbenzylated O-(α-d-glucopyranyl) trichloroacetimidate is converted upon retention to the n-octyl-1-thio-α-d-glucopyranoside (after debenzylation).

Synthese von n-Octyl-thioglucopyranosid nach R.R. Schmidt

The reaction of d-glucose with 1-octanethiol and Olah's reagent (70% hydrogen fluoride HF in pyridine) produces an anomeric mixture of n-octyl-1-thio-α,β-d-glucopyranoside in 95% yield which contains 44% α-anomeres and 56% β-anomers.

Synthese von n-Octyl-α, β-thioglucopyranosid mit Olah’s Reagenz

The pure α-octylthioglucoside is accessible by reaction of pentacetyl-β-d-glucose (from d-glucose, acetic anhydride and sodium acetate) in organic solvents at elevated temperatures with 1-octanethiol and boron trifluoride etherate and subsequent deacetylation.

Synthese von n-Octyl-α-thioglucopyranosid aus Pentaacetyl-β-glucose

== Properties ==
n-octyl-β-d-1-thioglucopyranoside is a colorless, odorless, hygroscopic, crystalline solid which readily dissolves in water and short-chain alcohols. Compared with the O-glucoside n-octyl-β-d-glucopyranoside, which has already been introduced earlier as detergent for biochemical applications, the analogous S-glucoside OTG appears to be particularly suitable due to its higher stability, especially against degradation by β-glucosidases.

Comparison of S'-Octylglucoside with O-Glucoside
characteristics	Critical micelle concentration	Solubilization ability	dialysability	Chem. Stability	Β-glucosidase stability	Transparency at 280 nm	Denaturation tendency	Chem. analytics
n-Octyl-β-d-thiogluco-pyranosid	9mM (+)	++	+	+	+	+	+	+
n-Octyl-β-d-gluco-pyranosid	23-25 mM +	++	++	(-)	–	+	+	+

++ very good + good (+) ok (-) poor – very poor

The cost advantage for octylthioglucoside stated in publications from the 1980s is evidently no longer given because of the recently developed, efficient enzymatic synthesis pathways for O-octylglucoside (directly from D-glucose, 1-octanol by means of β-glucosidase).

The α-anomeric octylthioglucoside exhibits liquid crystalline properties forming a smectic phase A.

== Application ==
Nonionic detergents solubilize membrane proteins gently and (largely) preserving their physiological function by interaction with the hydrophobic membrane regions embedded in the lipid bilayers of cell membranes. Above the so-called critical micelle concentration CMC [OTG: 9 mM, or 0.2772% (w/v)], mixed micelles of membrane proteins and surfactant molecules are formed, with OTG concentrations of 1.1-1.2% (w/v) for the solubilization of membrane proteins from E. coli. No denaturation of the membrane proteins was found after solubilization with octylthioglucoside.

For the analysis of the biological activity of membrane proteins, it is often necessary to reconstitute the proteins into the lipid bilayers of liposomes. For this, the solution of the solubilized protein is subject to dialysis or ion exchange chromatography in the presence of phospholipids or membrane lipid mixtures to remove the surfactant. For example, 95% of the OTG can be removed from a 43 mM surfactant solution under standard conditions within 6 hours.

Octylthioglucoside (15 mM) is clearly superior to its O-analog octyl glucoside (OT) in the solubilization and stabilization against thermal and light-induced denaturation of the light-driven proton pump Bacteriorhodopsin from the biomembranes of halobacteria.
