= Didecyldimethylammonium chloride =

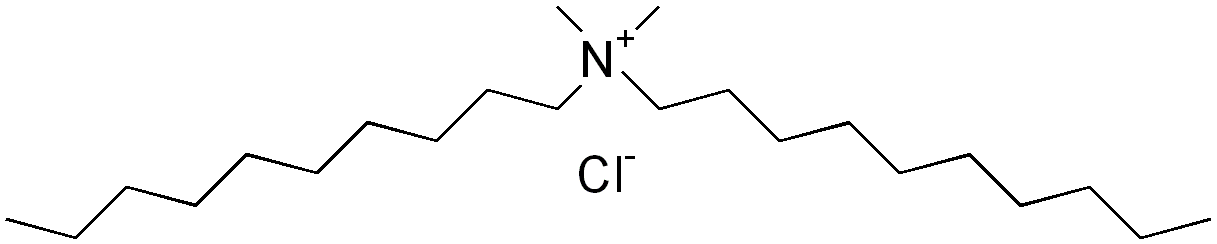

Names
- Preferred IUPAC name N-Decyl-N,N-dimethyldecan-1-aminium chloride
- Other names: DDAC; Dimethyldidecylammonium chloride; 1-Decanaminium; N-decyl-N,N-dimethyl-, chloride; Didecyldimethylammonium chloride; Didecyl dimethyl ammonium chloride; Quaternium-12; Ammonium, didecyldimethyl-, chloride

Identifiers
CAS Number	7173-51-5
3D model (JSmol)	Interactive image
ChEMBL	ChEMBL224987
ChemSpider	22027
ECHA InfoCard	100.027.751
PubChem CID	23558
UNII	JXN40O9Y9B
CompTox Dashboard (EPA)	DTXSID9032537
- InChI: InChI=1S/C22H48N.ClH/c1-5-7-9-11-13-15-17-19-21-23(3,4)22-20-18-16-14-12-10-8-6-2;/h5-22H2,1-4H3;1H/q+1;/p-1 Key: RUPBZQFQVRMKDG-UHFFFAOYSA-M; InChI=1/C22H48N.ClH/c1-5-7-9-11-13-15-17-19-21-23(3,4)22-20-18-16-14-12-10-8-6-2;/h5-22H2,1-4H3;1H/q+1;/p-1 Key: RUPBZQFQVRMKDG-REWHXWOFAJ
- SMILES: [Cl-].C(CCCCC[N+](C)(CCCCCCCCCC)C)CCCC

Properties
Chemical formula	C_{22}H_{48}ClN
Molar mass	362.08 g/mol
Appearance	colorless solid
Density	0.87 g/cm^{3} (20 °C)
Melting point	88 °C (190 °F; 361 K)

Pharmacology
ATC code	D08AJ06 (WHO)

Hazards
- Occupational safety and health (OHS/OSH)
Main hazards	toxic
- GHS labelling
Pictograms	(GHS05: Corrosive) (GHS07: Exclamation mark) (GHS09: Environmental hazard)
- Except where otherwise noted, data are given for materials in their standard state (at 25 °C [77 °F], 100 kPa). verify (what is ?) Infobox references

Didecyldimethylammonium chloride (DDAC) is the quaternary ammonium salt with the formula (CH_{3})_{2}N(C_{10}H_{21})_{2}Cl. The cation (CH_{3})_{2}N(C_{10}H_{21})^{+}_{2} and chloride comprise this salt, which is a colorless solid.

DDAC is an antiseptic/disinfectant. Like related quat salts, it disrupts lipid bilayers. The bacteriostatic (prevent growth) or bactericidal (kill microorganism) activity of DDAC depends on its concentration and the growth phase of the microbial population. It is a broad spectrum biocidal against bacteria and fungi and can be used as disinfectant cleaner for linen, recommended for use in hospitals, hotels and industries. It is also used in gynaecology, surgery, ophthalmology, pediatrics, OT, and for the sterilization of surgical instruments, endoscopes and surface disinfection.

== Safety and environmental considerations ==
DDAC is of concern in waste water treatment because of its toxicity and resilience. In mice this disinfectant was found to cause infertility and birth defects when combined with alkyl (60% C14, 25% C12, 15% C16) dimethyl benzyl ammonium chloride (ADBAC), when being fed at least 60 milligrams of disinfectant per kilogram of body weight, per day. These studies contradict the older toxicology data set on quaternary ammonia compounds which was reviewed by the U.S. Environmental Protection Agency (U.S. EPA) and the EU Commission. In addition, DDAC, as well as other quaternary ammonia compounds, can lead to the acquisition of resistance by microorganisms when employed in sub-lethal concentrations.

Europe and the United States differ on regulation for antimicrobials. Europe places all applied contact of antimicrobials under BPR while the United States breaks down contact into distinct categories. The FDA regulates drugs that come in contact with human and animals, while the EPA regulates drugs that come into contact with the environment. DDAC is under a tolerance exception for objects that come into contact with food, in which concentration levels need to be under 200ppm, or 240ppm (applies to quaternary ammonium compounds).

Human health is a concern as DDAC was given a toxicity rating of II during which rats were exposed to the chemical via oral route. DDAC has also been determined to be corrosive when put into direct contact with the eyes. There has been no drinking water study conducted between 2006 and 2017.

A study conducted in 2024 measuring QAC levels in different water sources (including, but not limited to, tap water) in New York, USA, found that both bottled and tap water were contaminated with QAC's. QAC's are completely soluble in water which makes filtering out the chemicals difficult. Stormwater runoff contained the highest concentration of QAC's of up to 1000 ng/L.

== See also ==
- Dimethyldioctadecylammonium chloride – longer di-C18 analogue
