= Surfactant =

Substance that lowers surface tension

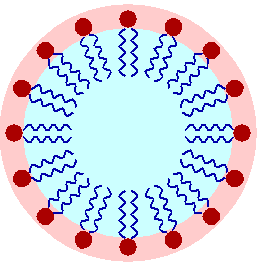
Schematic diagram of a micelle of oil in aqueous suspension, such as might occur in an emulsion of oil in water. In this example, the surfactant molecules' oil-soluble tails project into the oil (blue), while the water-soluble ends remain in contact with the water phase (red).

A surfactant is a chemical compound that decreases the surface tension or interfacial tension between two liquids, a liquid and a gas, or a liquid and a solid. The word surfactant is a blend of "surface-active agent", coined in 1950. As they consist of a water-repellent and a water-attracting part, they are emulsifiers, enabling water and oil to mix. They can also form foam, and facilitate the detachment of dirt.

Surfactants are among the most widespread and commercially important chemicals. Private households as well as many industries use them in large quantities as detergents and cleaning agents, but also as emulsifiers, wetting agents, foaming agents, antistatic additives, and dispersants.

Surfactants occur naturally in traditional plant-based detergents, e.g. horse chestnuts or soap nuts; they can also be found in the secretions of some caterpillars. Some of the most commonly used anionic surfactants, linear alkylbenzene sulfates (LAS), are produced from petroleum products. However, surfactants are increasingly produced in whole or in part from renewable biomass, like sugar, fatty alcohol from vegetable oils, by-products of biofuel production, and other biogenic material.

== Classification ==
Surfactants are compounds with hydrophilic "heads" and hydrophobic "tails." The "heads" of surfactants are polar and may or may not carry an ionic charge. The "tails" of most surfactants are fairly similar, often consisting of a hydrocarbon chain (linear or branched) and may comprise aromatic units. Most commonly, surfactants are classified according to the polarity of their head group: a non-ionic surfactant has no charged groups in its head. The head of an ionic surfactant carries a net positive or negative charge. If the charge is negative, the surfactant is called anionic; if the charge is positive, it is called cationic. If a surfactant contains a head with two oppositely charged groups, it is termed zwitterionic, or amphoteric.

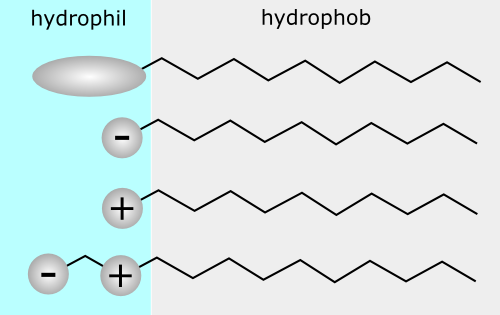
Surfactant classification according to the composition of their head: non-ionic, anionic, cationic, amphoteric.

However, surfactants may also be classified based on chemical structure or based on their properties / their application.

=== Classification according to charge / polarity ===
==== Anionic: sulfate, sulfonate, and phosphate, carboxylate derivatives ====
Anionic surfactants contain anionic functional groups at their head, such as sulfate, sulfonate, phosphate, and carboxylates. Prominent alkyl sulfates include ammonium lauryl sulfate, sodium lauryl sulfate (sodium dodecyl sulfate, SLS, or SDS), and the related alkyl-ether sulfates sodium laureth sulfate (sodium lauryl ether sulfate or SLES), and sodium myreth sulfate.

4-(5-Dodecyl) benzenesulfonate, a linear alkylbenzene sulfonate, one of the most common surfactants

Others include:

- Alkylbenzene sulfonates
- Docusate (dioctyl sodium sulfosuccinate)
- Perfluorooctanesulfonate (PFOS)
- Perfluorobutanesulfonate
- Alkyl-aryl ether phosphates
- Alkyl ether phosphates

Sodium stearate, the most common component of most soap, which comprises about 50% of commercial surfactants

Carboxylates are the most common surfactants and comprise the carboxylate salts (soaps), such as sodium stearate. More specialized species include sodium lauroyl sarcosinate and carboxylate-based fluorosurfactants such as perfluorononanoate, perfluorooctanoate (PFOA or PFO).

==== Cationic head groups ====
Cationic surfactants are extensively described in this review.

pH-dependent primary, secondary, or tertiary amines; primary and secondary amines become positively charged at pH < 10: octenidine dihydrochloride.

Permanently charged quaternary ammonium salts: cetrimonium bromide (CTAB), cetylpyridinium chloride (CPC), benzalkonium chloride (BAC), benzethonium chloride (BZT), dimethyldioctadecylammonium chloride, and dioctadecyldimethylammonium bromide (DODAB).

==== Zwitterionic surfactants ====
Zwitterionic (ampholytic) surfactants have both cationic and anionic centers attached to the same molecule. The cationic part is based on primary, secondary, or tertiary amines or quaternary ammonium cations. There is a variety of anionic parts, which include sulfonates, as in the sultaines CHAPS (3-[(3-cholamidopropyl)dimethylammonio]-1-propanesulfonate) and cocamidopropyl hydroxysultaine. Betaines such as cocamidopropyl betaine have a carboxylate with the ammonium. The most common biological zwitterionic surfactants have a phosphate anion with an amine or ammonium, such as the phospholipids phosphatidylserine, phosphatidylethanolamine, phosphatidylcholine, and sphingomyelins.

Lauryldimethylamine oxide and myristamine oxide are two commonly used zwitterionic surfactants of the tertiary amine oxides structural type.

==== Non-ionic ====
Non-ionic surfactants have covalently bonded oxygen-containing hydrophilic groups, which are bonded to hydrophobic parent structures. The water-solubility of the oxygen groups is the result of hydrogen bonding. Hydrogen bonding decreases with increasing temperature, and the water solubility of non-ionic surfactants therefore decreases with increasing temperature.

Non-ionic surfactants are less sensitive to water hardness than anionic surfactants, and they foam less strongly. The differences between the individual types of non-ionic surfactants are slight, and the choice is primarily governed having regard to the costs of special properties (e.g., effectiveness and efficiency, toxicity, dermatological compatibility, biodegradability) or permission for use in food.

===== Ethoxylates =====
Many important surfactants include a polyether chain terminating in a highly polar anionic group. The polyether groups often comprise ethoxylated (polyethylene oxide-like) sequences inserted to increase the hydrophilic character of a surfactant. Polypropylene oxides conversely, may be inserted to increase the lipophilic character of a surfactant, see also poloxamers.

====== Fatty alcohol ethoxylates ======
- Narrow-range ethoxylate
- Octaethylene glycol monododecyl ether
- Pentaethylene glycol monododecyl ether

====== Alkylphenol ethoxylates (APEs or APEOs) ======
- Nonoxynols
- Triton X-100

====== Fatty acid ethoxylates ======
Fatty acid ethoxylates are a class of very versatile surfactants, which combine in a single molecule the characteristic of a weakly anionic, pH-responsive head group with the presence of stabilizing and temperature responsive ethyleneoxide units.

====== Ethoxylated amines and/or fatty acid amides ======
- Polyethoxylated tallow amine
- Cocamide monoethanolamine
- Cocamide diethanolamine

===== Fatty acid esters of polyhydroxy compounds =====
====== Fatty acid esters of glycerol ======
- Glycerol monostearate
- Glycerol monolaurate

====== Fatty acid esters of sorbitol ======
Spans:

- Sorbitan monolaurate
- Sorbitan monostearate
- Sorbitan tristearate

Tweens:

- Tween 20
- Tween 40
- Tween 60
- Tween 80

===== Alkyl polyglucosides =====
Alkyl polyglycosides (APGs) are a class of non-ionic surfactants made from a sugar (like glucose) and a fatty alcohol. They are produced from renewable resources, possess a high biodegradability and mildness. For these reasons, they are widely used in detergents, cosmetics, and other applications.

- Decyl glucoside
- Lauryl glucoside
- Octyl glucoside

=== Classification according to chemical structure ===
Most surfactants comprise "tails" based on saturated or unsaturated hydrocarbons. Fluorosurfactants have fluorocarbon chains. Siloxane surfactants have siloxane chains.

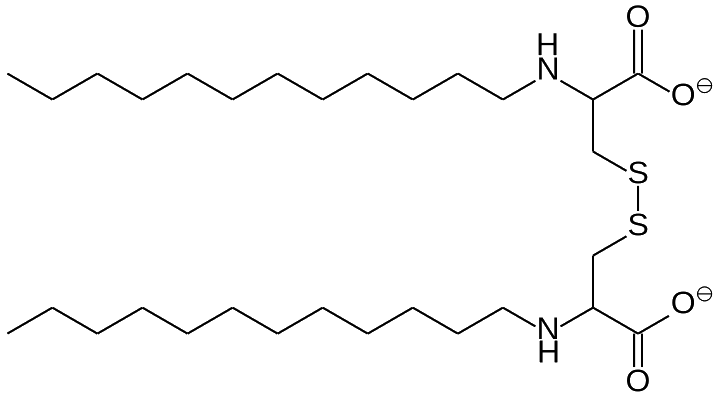
Gemini amino acid-based surfactant (based on cysteine)

Surfactant molecules have either one tail or two; those with two tails are said to be double-chained.

Amino acid-based surfactants are surfactants derived from an amino acid. Their properties vary and can be either anionic, cationic, or zwitterionic, depending on the amino acid used and which part of the amino acid is condensed with the alkyl/aryl chain.

Gemini surfactants consist of two surfactant molecules linked together at or near their head groups. Compared to monomeric surfactants, they have much lower critical micelle concentrations.

=== Classification according to properties / application ===
Type	Function	Example
Detergents	Remove dirt/oil by forming micelles	Laundry detergent
Foaming agents	Stabilize gas-liquid interfaces	Shaving foam, beer head
Wetting agents	Lower the contact angle so liquids spread better on solids	Paints, inks
Dispersants	Prevent solid particles from aggregating	Pigment dispersants in paint
Emulsifiers	Stabilize emulsions (= droplet mixtures of oil-in-water or water-in-oil)	Mayonnaise, lotions
Solubilizers	Help dissolve poorly soluble substances	Perfume in water-based sprays
Conditioners	Deposit active ingredients on hair/skin	Hair conditioners (often cationic surfactants)

== Composition and structure ==
Aggregate of anionic surfactants in water (spherical micelle)

Surfactant-oil droplets in water. The oil is dispersed in water and the surfactant is at the oil-water interface.

Surfactant molecules at the water surface (= air water interface)

Solid and hydrophobic particles (e. g. dirt) are removed from a solid (e. g. a fabric) with the aid of a surfactant (e. g. during washing in the washing machine)

Foam bubbles: a "soap bubble"

Schematic diagram of a micelle – the lipophilic tails of the surfactant ions remain inside the oil because they interact more strongly with oil than with water. The polar "heads" of the surfactant molecules coating the micelle interact more strongly with water, so they form a hydrophilic outer layer that forms a barrier between micelles. This inhibits the oil droplets, the hydrophobic cores of micelles, from merging into fewer, larger droplets ("emulsion breaking") of the micelle. The compounds that coat a micelle are typically amphiphilic in nature, meaning that micelles may be stable either as droplets of aprotic solvents such as oil in water, or as protic solvents such as water in oil. When the droplet is aprotic it is sometimes known as a reverse micelle.

Surfactants are (usually organic) compounds that are amphiphilic, which means that this molecule each contains a hydrophilic "water-seeking" group (the head), and a hydrophobic "water-avoiding" group (the tail). As a result, a surfactant contains both a water-soluble component and a water-insoluble component. Surfactants diffuse in water and get adsorbed at interfaces between air and water, or at the interface between oil and water in the case where water is mixed with oil. The water-insoluble hydrophobic group may extend out of the bulk water phase into a non-water phase such as air or oil phase, while the water-soluble head group remains bound in the water phase.

The hydrophobic tail may be either lipophilic ("oil-seeking") or lipophobic ("oil-avoiding") depending on its chemistry. Hydrocarbon groups are usually lipophilic, for use in soaps and detergents, while fluorocarbon groups are lipophobic, for use in repelling stains or reducing surface tension.

World production of surfactants is estimated at 15 million tons per year, of which about half are soaps. Other surfactants produced on a particularly large scale are linear alkylbenzene sulfonates (1.7 million tons/y), lignin sulfonates (600,000 tons/y), fatty alcohol ethoxylates (700,000 tons/y), and alkylphenol ethoxylates (500,000 tons/y).

=== Structure of surfactant phases in water ===
In the bulk aqueous phase, surfactants form aggregates, such as micelles, where the hydrophobic tails form the core of the aggregate and the hydrophilic heads are in contact with the surrounding liquid. Other types of aggregates can also be formed, such as spherical or cylindrical micelles or lipid bilayers. The shape of the aggregates depends on the chemical structure of the surfactants, namely the balance in size between the hydrophilic head and hydrophobic tail. A measure of this is the hydrophilic-lipophilic balance (HLB). Surfactants reduce the surface tension of water by adsorbing at the liquid-air interface. The relation that links the surface tension and the surface excess is known as the Gibbs isotherm.

=== Dynamics of surfactants at interfaces ===
The dynamics of surfactant adsorption is of great importance for practical applications such as in foaming, emulsifying or coating processes, where bubbles or drops are rapidly generated and need to be stabilized. The dynamics of absorption depend on the diffusion coefficient of the surfactant. As the interface is created, the adsorption is limited by the diffusion of the surfactant to the interface. In some cases, there can exist an energetic barrier to adsorption or desorption of the surfactant. If such a barrier limits the adsorption rate, the dynamics are said to be ‘kinetically limited'. Such energy barriers can be due to steric or electrostatic repulsions. The surface rheology of surfactant layers, including the elasticity and viscosity of the layer, play an important role in the stability of foams and emulsions.

=== Characterization of interfaces and surfactant layers ===
Interfacial and surface tension can be characterized by classical methods such as the -pendant or spinning drop method. Dynamic surface tensions, i.e. surface tension as a function of time, can be obtained by the maximum bubble pressure apparatus

The structure of surfactant layers can be studied by ellipsometry or X-ray reflectivity.

Surface rheology can be characterized by the oscillating drop method or shear surface rheometers such as double-cone, double-ring or magnetic rod shear surface rheometer.

== Applications ==
Surfactants are widely used due to their ability to modify surface and interfacial properties, making them relevant in processes involving the interaction of hydrophobic and hydrophilic substances. Their amphiphilic nature—containing both hydrophilic and hydrophobic parts—enables them to bridge these otherwise immiscible components, thereby facilitating mixing and enhancing the efficiency of various physical and chemical transformations. This makes surfactants useful in numerous fields where control over interfacial interactions is relevant.

Surfactants play an important role as cleaning, wetting, dispersing, emulsifying, foaming and anti-foaming agents in many practical applications and products, including detergents, fabric softeners, motor oils, emulsions, soaps, paints, adhesives, inks, anti-fogs, ski waxes, snowboard wax, in flotation, washing and enzymatic processes, and laxatives.

=== Food industry ===
Certain surfactants are used as emulsifiers or foaming agents in food. Examples can be found in the List of food additives.

The alkalization (saponification) of cocoa fat in drinking cocoa powder serves to reduce the surface tension of the milk and to enable faster wetting or suspension of the semi-fat cocoa powder.

=== Personal care and homecare ===
Surfactants are used in detergents, washing-up liquids, shampoos, shower gels, and similar products to increase the “solubility” of fat and dirt particles that adhere to laundry or the body in water.

Fabric softeners can consist of cationic surfactants that prevent laundry from becoming stiff when dry.

=== Pharmaceuticals and cosmetics ===
Emulsifiers are essential for producing water-in-oil emulsions, e.g. for skin creams. They are also necessary for a wide range of suspensions to maintain liquid drug formulations.

=== Plant protection products ===
Plant protection products contain surfactants to improve wetting (spreading) on plants. The most common wetting agent is ethoxylated tallow amine. Trisiloxanes or polyoxyethylated fatty alcohols are also used. Agrochemical formulations that use surfactants include herbicides (some), insecticides, biocides (sanitizers).

=== Medicine ===
Surfactants act to cause the displacement of air from the matrix of cotton pads and bandages so that medicinal solutions can be absorbed for application to various body areas. They also act to displace dirt and debris by the use of detergents in the washing of wounds and via the application of medicinal lotions and sprays to surface of skin and mucous membranes. Surfactants enhance remediation via soil washing, bioremediation, and phytoremediation.

Many spermicides contain surfactants (such as nonoxynol-9).

=== Biochemistry ===
In solution, detergents help solubilize a variety of chemical species by dissociating aggregates and unfolding proteins. Popular surfactants in the biochemistry laboratory are sodium lauryl sulfate (SDS) and cetyl trimethylammonium bromide (CTAB). Detergents are key reagents to extract protein by lysis of the cells and tissues: they disorganize the membrane's lipid bilayer (SDS, Triton X-100, X-114, CHAPS, DOC, and NP-40), and solubilize proteins. Milder detergents such as octyl thioglucoside, octyl glucoside or dodecyl maltoside are used to solubilize membrane proteins such as enzymes and receptors without denaturing them. Non-solubilized material is harvested by centrifugation or other means. For electrophoresis, for example, proteins are classically treated with SDS to denature the native tertiary and quaternary structures, allowing the separation of proteins according to their molecular weight.

Detergents have also been used to decellularise organs. This process maintains a matrix of proteins that preserves the structure of the organ and often the microvascular network. The process has been successfully used to prepare organs such as the liver and heart for transplant in rats. Pulmonary surfactants are also naturally secreted by type II cells of the lung alveoli in mammals.

=== Technology ===
==== Antistatic agents ====
Ionic surfactants also function as external antistatic agents to prevent electrostatic charging of plastic surfaces (ESD protection). Both anionic and cationic surfactants are used for this purpose[9].

==== Textile finishing ====
Perfluorinated surfactants, such as fluorotelomer alcohols (FTOH), are used as coating agents for textiles, carpets, and construction products to impart or enhance water and grease repellency. As members of the PFC group, however, they are subject to criticism because they are persistent and practically non-degradable in nature.

==== Cooling lubricants ====
Surfactants are employed in water-mixed cooling lubricants (water-in-oil emulsions) to provide effective cooling and lubrication during metal cutting operations.

==== Printer ink ====
Surfactants regulate the consistency of ink in inkjet printers. An insufficient amount of surfactants results in clumping of the color pigments, whereas an excessive amount renders the ink overly fluid during printing.

==== Paper recycling ====
In paper recycling, surfactants facilitate the detachment of ink particles from paper fibers (deinking) and assist in transporting the ink to the surface.

==== Oil and mining industry ====
Alkali surfactant polymers are used to mobilize oil in oil wells. Surfactants also play a key role in froth flotation processes for separating copper and other minerals from ores.

=== Fire fighting ===
Surfactants are used in firefighting (to make "wet water" that more quickly soaks into flammable materials) and pipelines (liquid drag reducing agents).

"Wet water" provides the advantage of allowing the extinguishing water to penetrate burning materials such as wood or fabric more effectively, thereby enhancing its cooling capacity. Additionally, extinguishing water mixed with surface-active agents can be sprayed over greater distances at the same pumping capacity due to their flow-improving properties. Special foaming agents (Aqueous Film Forming Foam, AFFF) for combating liquid fires contain perfluorinated surfactants that form a gas-tight liquid film between the burning material and the foam. This simultaneously imparts superior sliding properties to the foam blanket, thereby enabling the effective extinguishment of larger liquid fires.

=== Surfactants in droplet-based microfluidics ===
Surfactants play an important role in droplet-based microfluidics in the stabilization of the droplets, and the prevention of the fusion of droplets during incubation.

=== Human body and nature ===
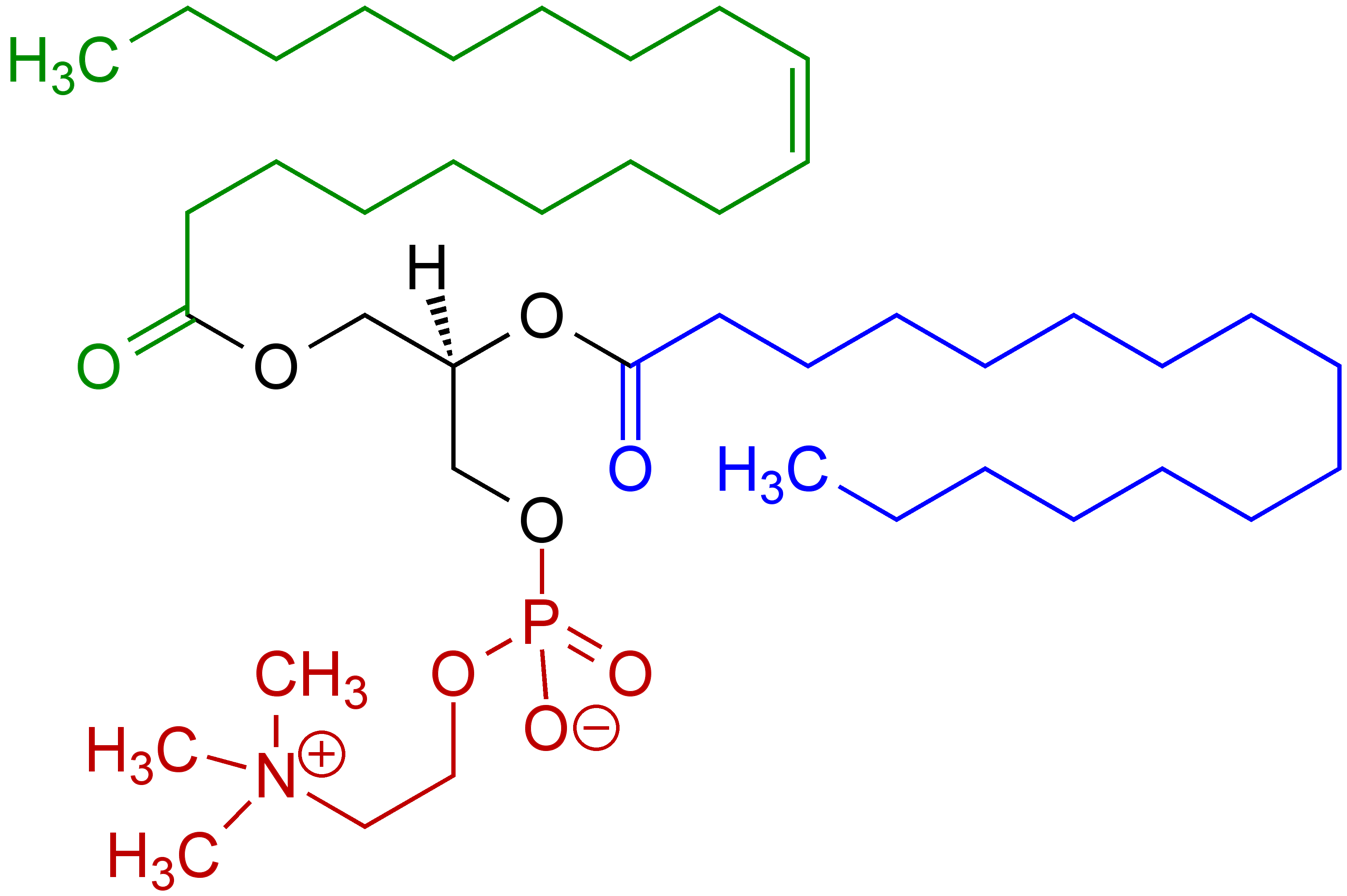
Phosphatidylcholine, found in lecithin, is a pervasive biological surfactant. Shown in red – choline and phosphate group; black – glycerol; green – monounsaturated fatty acid; blue – saturated fatty acid.

The human body produces diverse surfactants. Pulmonary surfactant is produced in the lungs in order to facilitate breathing by increasing total lung capacity, and lung compliance. In respiratory distress syndrome or RDS, surfactant replacement therapy helps patients have normal respiration by using pharmaceutical forms of the surfactants. One example of a pharmaceutical pulmonary surfactant is Survanta (beractant) or its generic form Beraksurf, produced by Abbvie and Tekzima respectively. Bile salts, a surfactant produced in the liver, play an important role in digestion.

Certain caterpillars (of the moth species Spodoptera exigua, South East Asia) spit a surfactant-containing secretion at predators. This deters attacking ants, allowing the caterpillars to escape. The surfactants in the caterpillars' oral secretions reduce its surface tension. Instead of rolling off the ants' water-repellent skin like normal water, the secretion soaks the attackers. The affected ants then clean themselves, which gives the caterpillar enough time to escape.

== Safety and environmental risks ==
Most anionic and non-ionic surfactants are non-toxic, having LD50 comparable to table salt. The toxicity of quaternary ammonium compounds, which are antibacterial and antifungal, varies. Dialkyldimethylammonium chlorides (DDAC, DSDMAC) used as fabric softeners have high LD50 (5 g/kg) and are essentially non-toxic, while the disinfectant alkylbenzyldimethylammonium chloride has an LD50 of 0.35 g/kg. Prolonged exposure to surfactants can irritate and damage the skin because surfactants disrupt the lipid membrane that protects skin and other cells. Skin irritancy generally increases in the series non-ionic, amphoteric, anionic, cationic surfactants.

Surfactants are routinely deposited in numerous ways on land and into water systems, whether as part of an intended process or as industrial and household waste.

Anionic surfactants can be found in soils as the result of sewage sludge application, wastewater irrigation, and remediation processes. Relatively high concentrations of surfactants together with multimetals can represent an environmental risk. At low concentrations, surfactant application is unlikely to have a significant effect on trace metal mobility.

In the case of the Deepwater Horizon oil spill, unprecedented amounts of Corexit were sprayed directly into the ocean at the leak and on the sea-water's surface. The apparent theory was that the surfactants isolate droplets of oil, making it easier for petroleum-consuming microbes to digest the oil. The active ingredient in Corexit is dioctyl sodium sulfosuccinate (DOSS), sorbitan monooleate (Span 80), and polyoxyethylenated sorbitan monooleate (Tween-80).

=== Biodegradation ===
Because of the volume of surfactants released into the environment, for example laundry detergents in waters, their biodegradation is of great interest. Attracting much attention is the non-biodegradability and extreme persistence of fluorosurfactant, e.g. perfluorooctanoic acid (PFOA). Strategies to enhance degradation include ozone treatment and biodegradation. Two major surfactants, linear alkylbenzene sulfonates (LAS) and the alkyl phenol ethoxylates (APE) break down under aerobic conditions found in sewage treatment plants and in soil to nonylphenol, which is thought to be an endocrine disruptor. Interest in biodegradable surfactants has led to much interest in "biosurfactants" such as those derived from amino acids. Biobased surfactants can offer improved biodegradation. However, whether surfactants damage the cells of fish or cause foam mountains on bodies of water depends primarily on their chemical structure and not on whether the carbon originally used came from fossil sources, carbon dioxide or biomass.

== See also ==
- Anti-fog – Chemicals that prevent the condensation of water as small droplets on a surface
- Cleavable detergent
- Disodium cocoamphodiacetate
- Emulsion – Mixture of two or more immiscible liquids
- Hydrotrope – Chemical substance
- MBAS assay – Scientific testing method, an assay that indicates anionic surfactants in water with a bluing reaction.
- Niosome – Non-ionic surfactant-based vesicle
- Oil dispersants – Mixture of emulsifiers and solvents used to treat oil spills
- Surfactant leaching
- Surfactants in paint

Scale	Generation	Structure	Stability	Dynamic	Experiments and characterization	Transport properties	Irisations	Maths	Applications	Fun
Surfactants		Micelles, HLB		Surface rheology, adsorption	Langmuir trough, ellipsometry, Xray, surface rheology					
Films	Frankel's law	Surface tension, DLVO, disjoining pressure	dewetting, bursting	Marangoni, surface rheology	Interferometry, Thin film balance		Interferences	double bubble theorem		Giant films
Bubbles		shape, Plateau's laws	foam drainage	T1 process		acoustics, electric	Interferences	double bubble theory		Giant bubbles, coloured bubbles, freezing
Foam		Liquid fraction, metastable state	Coalescence, avalanches, coarsening, foam drainage	rheology	light scattering acoustics, conductimetry, Surface Evolver, bubble model, Potts' model	acoustics, light scattering	light scattering	Packing and topology	Aquafoams	
