= Critical micelle concentration =

Concentration of surfactants above which micelles form

In colloidal and surface chemistry, the critical micelle concentration (CMC) is defined as the concentration of surfactants above which micelles form and all additional surfactants added to the system will form micelles.

The CMC is an important characteristic of a surfactant. Before reaching the CMC, the surface tension changes strongly with the concentration of the surfactant. After reaching the CMC, the surface tension remains relatively constant or changes with a lower slope. The value of the CMC for a given dispersant in a given medium depends on temperature, pressure, and (sometimes strongly) on the presence and concentration of other surface active substances and electrolytes. In standard aqueous solutions, micelles only form above critical micelle temperature (CMT), often called Krafft point when related to ionic-surfactants. Mixed micelles can form below CMT as the kinetics of precipitation are altered.

For example, the value of CMC for sodium dodecyl sulfate in water (without other additives or salts) at 25 °C, atmospheric pressure, is 8×10^{−3} mol/L.

CMCs for common surfactants
Surfactant	CMC (molarity)	Category
Sodium octyl sulfate	0.13	anionic surfactant
Sodium dodecyl sulfate	0.0083	anionic surfactant
Sodium tetradecyl sulfate	0.0021	anionic surfactant
Decyltrimethylammonium bromide	0.065	cationic surfactant
Dodecyltrimethylammonium bromide	0.016	cationic surfactant
Hexadecyltrimethylammonium bromide	0.00092	cationic surfactant
Penta(ethyleneglycol)monooctyl ether	0.0009	neutral surfactant
Penta(ethyleneglycol)monodecyl ether	0.0009	neutral surfactant
Pentaethylene glycol monododecyl ether	0.000065	neutral surfactant

== Description ==
Top to Bottom: Increasing concentration of surfactant in water first leads to the formation of a layer on the surface. After reaching the CMC micelles begin forming. Notice that the existence of micelles does not preclude the existence of individual surfactant molecules in solution.

Upon introducing surfactants (or any surface active materials) into a system, they will initially partition into the interface, reducing the system free energy by:

1. lowering the energy of the interface (calculated as area times surface tension), and
2. removing the hydrophobic parts of the surfactant from contact with water.

Subsequently, when the surface coverage by the surfactants increases, the surface free energy (surface tension) decreases and the surfactants start aggregating into micelles, thus again decreasing the system's free energy by decreasing the contact area of hydrophobic parts of the surfactant with water. Upon reaching CMC, any further addition of surfactants will just increase the number of micelles (in the ideal case).

According to one well-known definition, CMC is the total concentration of surfactants under the conditions:

if C = CMC, (d^{3}$\phi$/dC_{t}^{3}) = 0
$\phi$ = A[C_{s}] + B[C_{m}]; i.e., in words C_{s} = [single surfactant ion] , C_{m} = [micelles] and A and B are proportionality constants
C_{t} = C_{s} + NC_{m}; i.e., N = represents the number of detergent ions per micelle

== Measurement ==
The CMC generally depends on the method of measuring the samples, since A and B depend on the properties of the solution such as conductance, photochemical characteristics, or surface tension. When the degree of aggregation is monodisperse, then the CMC is not related to the method of measurement. On the other hand, when the degree of aggregation is polydisperse, then CMC is related to both the method of measurement and the dispersion.

The common procedure to determine the CMC from experimental data is to look for the intersection (inflection point) of two straight lines traced through plots of the measured property versus the surfactant concentration. This visual data analysis method is highly subjective and can lead to very different CMC values depending on the type of representation, the quality of the data and the chosen interval around the CMC. A preferred method is the fit of the experimental data with a model of the measured property. Fit functions for properties such as electrical conductivity, surface tension, NMR chemical shifts, absorption, self-diffusion coefficients, fluorescence intensity and mean translational diffusion coefficient of fluorescent dyes in surfactant solutions have been presented. These fit functions are based on a model for the concentrations of monomeric and micellised surfactants in solution, which establishes a well-defined analytical definition of the CMC, independent from the technique.

The CMC is the concentration of surfactants in the bulk at which micelles start forming. The word bulk is important because surfactants partition between the bulk and interface and CMC is independent of interface and is therefore a characteristic of the surfactant molecule. In most situations, such as surface tension measurements or conductivity measurements, the amount of surfactant at the interface is negligible compared to that in the bulk and CMC can be approximated by the total concentration. In practice, CMC data is usually collected using laboratory instruments which allow the process to be partially automated, for instance by using specialised tensiometers.

== Practical considerations ==
When the interfacial areas are large, the amount of surfactant at the interface cannot be neglected. If, for example, air bubbles are introduced into a solution of a surfactant above CMC, these bubbles, as they rise to the surface, remove surfactants from the bulk to the top of the solution creating a foam column and thus reducing the concentration in bulk to below CMC. This is one of the easiest methods to remove surfactants from effluents (see foam flotation). Thus, foams with sufficient interfacial area are devoid of micelles. Similar reasoning holds for emulsions.

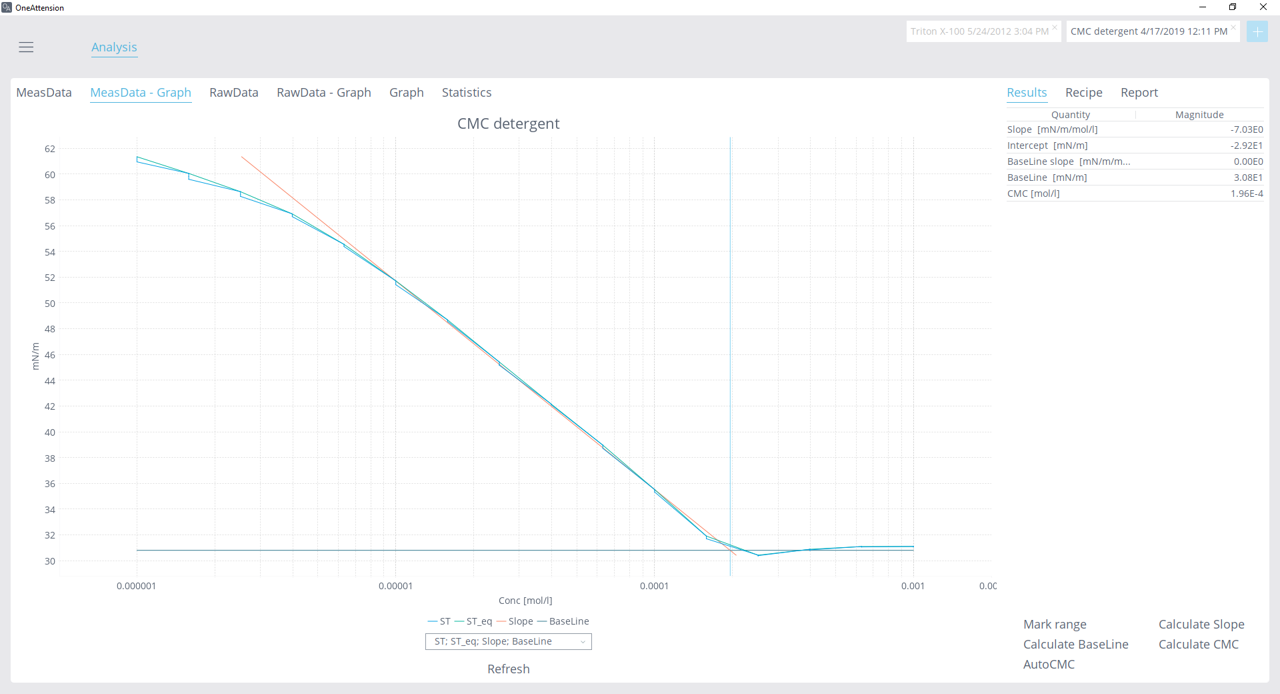
CMC is most typically measured by plotting surface tension versus surfactant concentration in an automated measurement.

In the petroleum industry, the critical micelle concentration (CMC) is considered before injecting a surfactant into a reservoir for enhanced oil recovery (EOR). Below the CMC, the surfactant no longer effectively reduces the interfacial tension between the oil and water phases. Therefore, the surfactant concentration is typically maintained slightly above the CMC so that losses due to dissolution in the existing reservoir brine do not significantly reduce performance. Ideally, the surfactant should operate at the lowest possible interfacial tension (IFT).

== See also ==
- Detergent
- Micelle
- Surface tension
- Surfactant
