= C6H10O4 =

The molecular formula C_{6}H_{10}O_{4} (molar mass: 146.14 g/mol, exact mass: 146.057909 u) may refer to:

- Aceburic acid
- Adipic acid
- Conduritol, a cyclitol or cyclic polyol
- Dianhydrohexitols
  - Isoidide
  - Isomannide
  - Isosorbide
- Ethylidene diacetate
- Glucal
- Ketopantoic acid
- Diethyl oxalate
