= Tween (disambiguation) =

A tween is a child in the stage of preadolescence, between middle childhood and early adolescence, mainly referring to children ages 9 to 12

Tween may also refer to:

- Tween (Dungeons & Dragons), a creature in the Dungeon & Dragons series
- Tweening (short from inbetweening), an animation technique that gives the appearance of motion
- Tween Brands, a store brand targeting the preteen market owned by Ascena Retail Group
- Tween (album), an album by Wye Oak
- Brand name of several laboratory detergents:
  - Tween 20
  - Tween 40
  - Tween 60
  - Tween 80

== See also ==
- Teen (disambiguation)
- Tweener (disambiguation)
- Tweenies, a British children's TV programme
- Tweeny
- Between (disambiguation)
- Twiins, a Slovak pop duo
