= Radioimmunoprecipitation assay buffer =

Lysis buffer

Radioimmunoprecipitation assay buffer (RIPA buffer) is a lysis buffer used to lyse cells and tissue for the radio immunoprecipitation assay (RIPA). This buffer is more denaturing than NP-40 or Triton X-100 because it contains the ionic detergents SDS and sodium deoxycholate as active constituents and is particularly useful for disruption of nuclear membranes in the preparation of nuclear extracts. The stronger detergents in RIPA buffer (such as SDS) cause greater protein denaturation and decrease protein-protein interactions.

== Recipe ==
RIPA buffer recipes vary slightly between authors and may include:

- 10-50 mM Tris-HCl (10 mM sodium phosphate may be used instead), pH 7–8
- 150 mM NaCl to keep the osmotic pressure near physiological
- nonionic detergents (1% Triton X-100 or NP-40) to prevent non-specific interactions between proteins or with the tube
- anionic detergents (0.1-0.5% deoxycholate, 0.1-0.5% SDS).

The following ingredients are optional and included as needed:

- Protease inhibitors (1 mM PMSF (fresh from 1 M stock in i-propanol), 1 μg/mL each leupeptin, aprotinin, pepstatin, 1-5 mM EDTA, 0.5-1 mM EGTA, 5 mM aminocaproic acid) or commercial protease inhibitor cocktail (use according to the manufacturer's instruction)
- 1 mM each Na_{3}VO_{4} and Na_{4}P_{2}O_{7} as phosphatase inhibitor (if phosphorylation status is important)
- 1 mM NaF as preservative
- 5-10 mM dithiothreitol (DTT) or β-mercaptoethanol as a reducing agent.
