= TBST =

In molecular biology, TBST (or TTBS) is a mixture of tris-buffered saline (TBS) (a buffer solution) and Polysorbate 20 (a polysorbate-type nonionic surfactant). Polysorbate 20 is also known as Tween 20, a commercial brand name. It is a common detergent used in many buffers for washing nitrocellulose membrane in western blotting and microtiter plate wells in ELISA assays. Tris is a buffer that maintains a pH of 7–9.2.

== Contents of TBS-Tween ==
The following is a sample recipe for TBST:

- 20 mM Tris
- 150 mM NaCl
- 0.1% Tween 20

Adjust pH with HCl to pH 7.4–7.6

The simplest way to prepare a TBS-Tween solution is to use TBS-T tablets. They are formulated to give a ready to use TBST solution upon dissolution in 500 ml of deionized water.
