= IGEPAL CA-630 =

Detergent

IGEPAL CA-630 is a nonionic, non-denaturing detergent. Its official IUPAC name is octylphenoxypolyethoxyethanol. IGEPAL is a registered trademark of Rhodia.

IGEPAL CA-630 is sold by Sigma-Aldrich and is claimed to be a "chemically indistinguishable" substitute for Nonidet P-40 (a trademark of Shell Chemical Company) which is no longer manufactured. However, a 2017 publication reported that IGEPAL 630 was ten-fold more potent than Nonidet P-40 in a tubulin polymerisation assay.

All IGEPAL CA surfactants are derived from octylphenol. This serves as the hydrophobic part. Different amounts of ethylene oxide are combined with this part to get a balance of hydrophobic/hydrophilic substances (measured by HLB). This balance has an important impact on wetting detergency, foam, solubility, emulsification. IGEPAL CA-630 has HLB of 13.4, similar to that of Triton X-100 (13.4) and thus belongs to the detergent range (HLB 13-15); this is significantly less than 17.8 of tergitol NP-40 or 16.7 of Polysorbate 20 (also known as Tween 20), which both belong in the solubilizer range (15-18) of HLB.

Ca-630 is completely miscible with water.

== Human toxicity ==
CA-630 is not a primary skin irritant nor sensitizer. However, it is a severe eye irritant.

== See also ==
Triton X-100
