= Polysorbate =

Class of chemical compounds

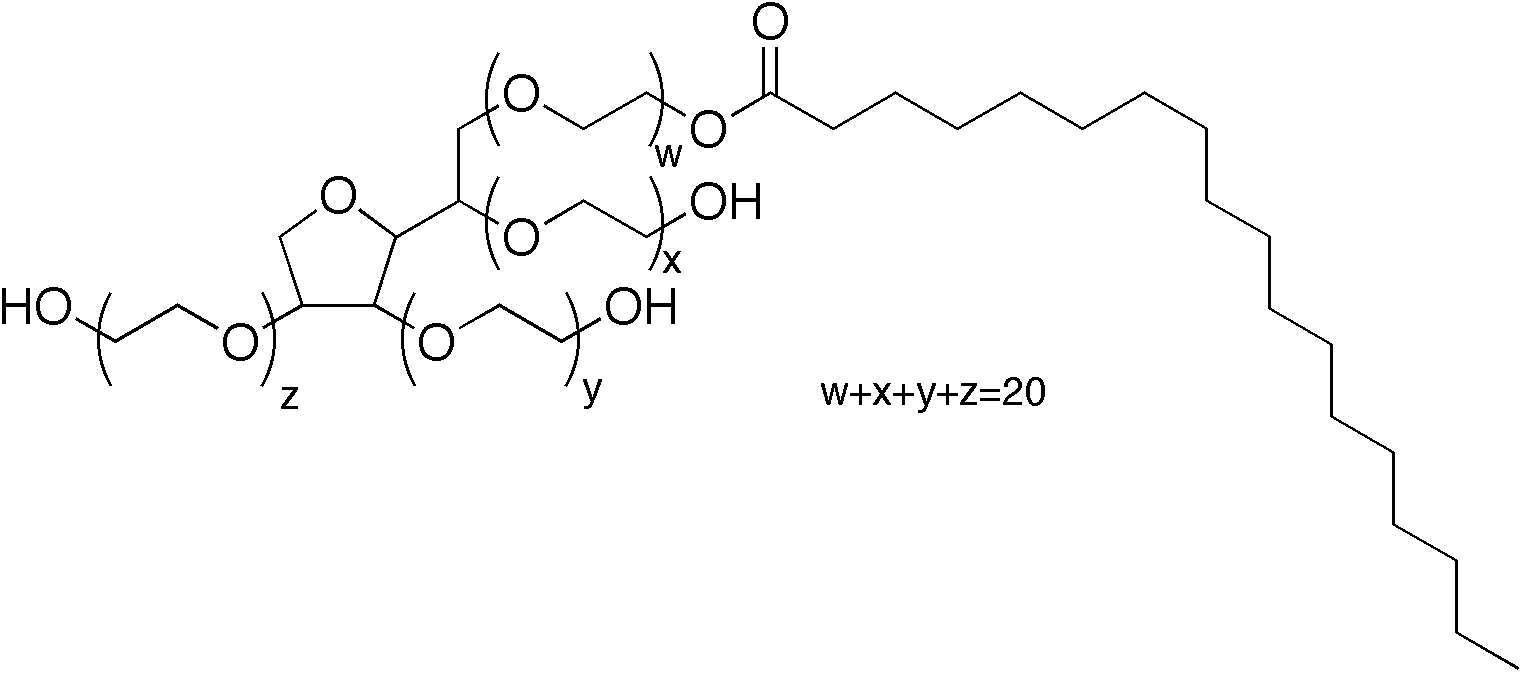
Polysorbate 20, a compound used as a food additive in some pudding mixes to prevent scorching during preparation

Polysorbates are a class of emulsifiers used in some pharmaceuticals and food preparation. They are commonly used in oral and topical pharmaceutical dosage forms. They are also often used in cosmetics to solubilize essential oils into water-based products. Polysorbates are oily liquids derived from ethoxylated sorbitan (a derivative of sorbitol) esterified with fatty acids. Common brand names for polysorbates include Lumisorb, Hedjuvan, Kolliphor, Scattics, Alkest, Canarcel, Tween, and Kotilen.

== Examples ==
- Polysorbate 20 (polyoxyethylene (20) sorbitan monolaurate)
- Polysorbate 40 (polyoxyethylene (20) sorbitan monopalmitate)
- Polysorbate 60 (polyoxyethylene (20) sorbitan monostearate)
- Polysorbate 80 (polyoxyethylene (20) sorbitan monooleate)

The number following the 'polysorbate' part is related to the type of major fatty acid associated with the molecule. Monolaurate is indicated by 20, monopalmitate is indicated by 40, monostearate by 60, and monooleate by 80. The number 20 following the 'polyoxyethylene' part refers to the total number of oxyethylene (–CH_{2}CH_{2}O–) groups found in the molecule.

== See also ==
- Sorbitan monolaurate
- Sorbitan monostearate
- Sorbitan tristearate
- Sorbitan monooleate
