= P40 =

P40 may refer to:

== Proteins ==
- Interleukin-12 subunit beta
- Neutrophil cytosolic factor 4
- Ribosomal protein SA

== Vehicles ==
- Brazilian patrol boat Grajaú (P40)
- Carro Armato P 40, an Italian tank
- Curtiss P-40 Warhawk, an American military aircraft
- Percival Prentice, a British trainer aircraft
- Pottier P.40, a French sport aircraft
- P40 Genesis, an American locomotive

== Other uses ==
- Huawei P40, a smartphone
- Kel-Tec P-40, a pistol
- Nonidet P-40, a detergent
- P-40 APPLE mine, a Vietnamese mine
- P-40 radar, a Soviet radar
- Papyrus 40, a biblical manuscript
- Phosphorus-40, an isotope of phosphorus
- ThinkPad P40 Yoga, a laptop
- P40, a Nissan P engine
- P40, prohibited airspace over Thurmont, Maryland, the site of Presidential retreat Camp David
- Nvidia Tesla P40, a GPU accelerator
