= Debubblizer =

A debubblizer is a surface tension chemical compound that is used in certain industrial processes to minimize air bubbles when casting a mold or impression. In some manufacturing operations, such as dentistry, it is also a surfactant or a wetting agent that is sprayed on the set impression material to improve wettability. Its reduction of surface tension allows for mixing and will eliminate air bubbles to produce fine casings.

== Composition and structure ==
During the bulk aqueous phase, the debubblizer formula bonds where the water-resistant tails form the center of the mass, and the waterproof heads are in contact with the surrounding liquid. Other types of groups and water-resistant charges touch the surrounding fluid. Additional forms can also combine to make spherical or cylindrical micelles or lipid bilayers. The shape of the chemical combinations depends on the chemical structure of the debubblizer. This is calculated by measuring the hydrophilic balance (HLB). The debubblizer reduces the surface tension of the water by going through surface assimilation when in the liquid-air stage.

== Applications ==
While debubblizer is often used when pouring molds because of its chemical effect on oxygen, it is often used for other processes such as those referenced in the term surfactant.

== Engineering ==
In engineering, a debubblizer pertains to an individual or device that removes bubbles from plastic tubing rods.

=== Also See ===
Orthodontics, Dental prosthesis, Dental implant, and Dentures .
