= Sorbitan monolaurate =

- Major chemical component of sorbitan monolaurate

Names
- Systematic IUPAC name (2Ξ)-2-[(2R,3R,4S)-3,4-Dihydroxyoxolan-2-yl]-2-hydroxyethyl dodecanoate
- Other names: Dodecanoic acid [2-[(2R,3R,4S)-3,4-dihydroxy-2-tetrahydrofuranyl]-2-hydroxyethyl] ester; alkamuls s 20; glycomul lC; sorbitan laurate; Span 20; E493

Identifiers
CAS Number	Span 20: 1338-39-2
3D model (JSmol)	Span 20: Interactive image
Beilstein Reference	8355657
ChemSpider	Span 20: 17345994
ECHA InfoCard	100.014.240
E number	E493 (thickeners, ...)
PubChem CID	Span 20: 16218599
RTECS number	Span 20: WG2920000
UNII	Span 20: 6W9PS8B71J
CompTox Dashboard (EPA)	Span 20: DTXSID6027395
- InChI: InChI=1/C18H34O6/c1-2-3-4-5-6-7-8-9-10-11-16(21)23-13-15(20)18-17(22)14(19)12-24-18/h14-15,17-20,22H,2-13H2,1H3/t14-,15?,17+,18+/m0/s1 Key: LWZFANDGMFTDAV-WYDSMHRWSA-N
- SMILES: Span 20: CCCCCCCCCCCC(=O)OCC(C1C(C(CO1)O)O)O

Properties
Chemical formula	C_{18}H_{34}O_{6}
Molar mass	346.464 g·mol^{−1}
Density	1.032 g/cm^{3}
Solubility in water	insoluble

Hazards
Flash point	110 °C (230 °F; 383 K)
- Except where otherwise noted, data are given for materials in their standard state (at 25 °C [77 °F], 100 kPa). Infobox references

Sorbitan monolaurate is a mixture of esters formed from the fatty acid lauric acid and polyols derived from sorbitol, including sorbitan and isosorbide. As a food additive, it is designated with the E number E493.

== See also ==
- Sorbitan monostearate
