= Flossie Wong-Staal =

Chinese-American virologist and molecular biologist (1946–2020)

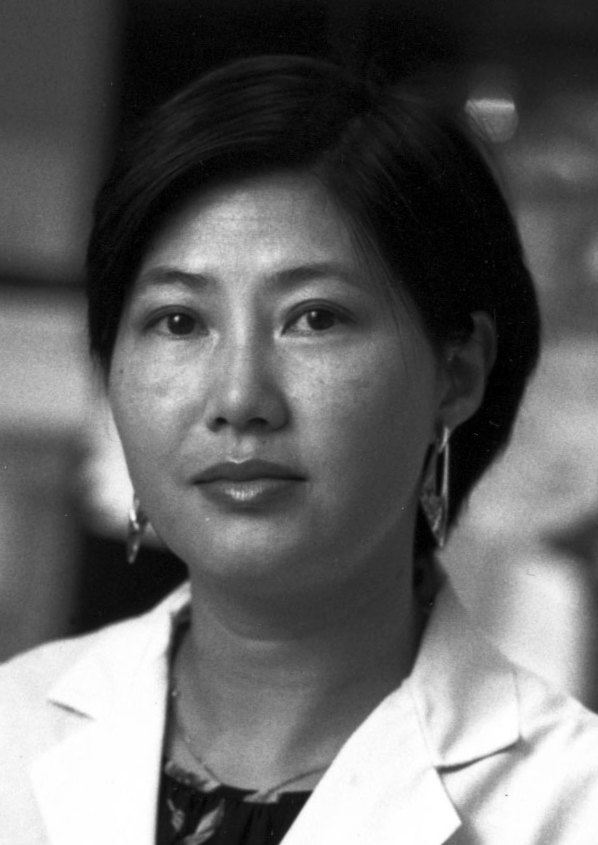
- Born: Wong Yee Ching; August 27, 1946; Guangzhou, Guangdong, Republic of China
- Died: July 8, 2020 (aged 73); La Jolla, California, U.S.
- Education: University of California, Los Angeles (Ph.D., 1972)
- Known for: Cloning of HIV
- Scientific career
- Fields: Virology
- Workplaces: University of California, San Diego, ItherX Pharmaceuticals Inc.
- Academic advisors: Robert Gallo

Flossie Wong-Staal (née Wong Yee Ching, Chinese: 黄以静; pinyin: Huáng Yǐjìng; August 27, 1946 – July 8, 2020) was a Chinese-American virologist and molecular biologist. She was the first scientist to clone HIV and determine the function of its genes, which was a major step in proving that HIV is the cause of AIDS. From 1990 to 2002, she held the Florence Riford Chair in AIDS Research at the University of California, San Diego (UCSD). She was co-founder and, after retiring from UCSD, she became the chief scientific officer of Immusol, which was renamed iTherX Pharmaceuticals in 2007 when it transitioned to a drug development company focused on hepatitis C and continued as chief scientific officer.

== Early life ==
Wong-Staal was born as Wong Yee Ching in Guangzhou, China, in 1946. The third child in her family of four, she grew up with two brothers and a sister. In 1952, her family was among the many Chinese citizens who fled to Hong Kong after the Communist revolution in the late 1940s. During her time in Hong Kong, Wong attended Maryknoll Convent School, where she excelled in science. Although no women in her family had ever worked outside the home or studied science, her parents supported her academic pursuits. Throughout her time at the school she was encouraged by many of her teachers to further her studies in the United States. Her teachers also suggested she change her name to something in English. Her father chose the name "Flossie" for her after a massive typhoon that had struck Southeast Asia around this time.

== Education ==
When she was 18, she left Hong Kong to attend the University of California, Los Angeles, where she pursued a Bachelor of Science degree in bacteriology. She graduated cum laude in just three years. After earning her bachelor's degree, she went on to earn a Ph.D. in molecular biology from UCLA in 1972. She conducted her postdoctoral work at the University of California, San Diego, where she continued to research.

== HIV cloning ==
Her postdoctoral work continued until 1973, when she moved to Bethesda, Maryland, to work for Robert Gallo at the National Cancer Institute (NCI). At the institute, Wong-Staal began her research into retroviruses. Two years later, Wong-Staal became the first researcher to clone HIV. She also completed genetic mapping of the virus which made it possible to develop HIV tests. This led to the first genetic map of the virus, which aided in the development of blood tests for HIV. Wong-Staal also provided the molecular biology necessary for the second-generation blood test for HIV, which detected the virus through its genome rather than through antibodies. This advance enabled the large-scale screening of donated blood, preventing transmission through blood transfusions.

== Research ==
In the late 1970s, Wong-Staal's team, alongside Dr. Gallo, conducted research on the human retrovirus, human T cell leukemia virus (HTLV), and determined that it was the causative agent in human adult T cell leukemia. Her team specifically studied the molecular virology of HTLV-1 by examining its transcriptional activators and posttranslational regulators. This discovery was significant in the study of human retroviruses as there was prior debate as to whether retroviruses could cause human disease.

In 1990, Wong-Staal was recruited from NCI to the University of California, San Diego (UCSD), where she started the Center for AIDS Research. Wong-Staal continued her research into HIV/AIDS at UCSD. Wong-Staal's research focused on gene therapy, using a ribozyme "molecular knife" to repress HIV in stem cells. The protocol she developed was the second to be funded by the United States government. In 1990 a team of researchers led by Wong-Staal studied the effects that the Tat protein within the viral strain HIV-1 would have on the growth of cells found within Kaposi's sarcoma lesions commonly found in AIDS patients.

The team of researchers performed tests on a variety of cells that carried the Tat protein and observed the rate of cell proliferation in cells infected by HIV-1 and the control, a culture of healthy human endothelial cells. Wong-Staal used a type of cellular analysis known as radioimmunoprecipitation in order to detect the presence of KS lesions in cells with varying amounts of the Tat protein. The results of these tests showed that the amount of Tat protein within a cell infected by HIV-1 is directly correlated to the amount of KS lesions a patient may have. These findings were essential in developing new treatments for HIV/AIDS patients who suffer from these dangerous lesions.

Over the course of her career, Wong-Staal published more than 400 papers on human retroviruses and AIDS.

== Achievements ==
In 1994, Wong-Staal was named as chairman of UCSD's newly created Center for AIDS Research. In that same year, Wong-Staal was elected to the Institute of Medicine of the U.S. National Academies, and to Taiwan's Academia Sinica. In 1995, Wong-Staal was elected to the board of directors of United Biomedical, Inc. (UBI), where she had previously served as a consultant and scientific advisor.

In 2002, Wong-Staal retired from UCSD and accepted the title of professor emerita. She then joined Immusol, a biopharmaceutical company that she co-founded with her second husband, Jeffrey McKelvy, while she was at UCSD, as chief scientific officer. Recognizing the need for improved drugs for hepatitis C (HCV), she transitioned Immusol to an HCV therapeutics focus and renamed it iTherX Pharmaceuticals.

That same year, Discover named Wong-Staal one of the fifty "most extraordinary women scientists". Wong-Staal remained as a research professor of medicine at UCSD until her death on July 8, 2020.

In 2007, The Daily Telegraph heralded Wong-Staal as #32 of the "Top 100 Living Geniuses".

For her contributions to science, the Institute for Scientific Information named Wong-Staal "the top woman scientist of the 1980s". In 2019, she was inducted into the National Women's Hall of Fame.

Scientist magazine named her one of the "ten superstars of science" in 1990. This was due to her being part of the team that discovered HIV and her effort of successfully cloning the HIV virus which led to its genetic mapping and the ability to screen blood for HIV.

== Legacy ==
Wong-Staal's contributions to the understanding of HIV are considered foundational to modern AIDS treatment. Her cloning of the HIV genome provided the molecular basis for diagnostic blood tests, enabling the screening of donated blood for the virus and preventing transfusion-related infections. Her discovery of micro-variation in HIV directly informed the development of combination antiretroviral therapy—the 'drug cocktail'—that transformed HIV from a near-universal death sentence into a manageable chronic condition.

She published more than 400 papers on human retroviruses and AIDS and held more than four dozen patents related to HIV research, including US Patent No 9,328,391.

Wong-Staal was also recognized as a trailblazer for women in science. She was the most-cited female scientist of the 1980's, with nearly 7,800 citations. Upon her death in July 2020, tributes were published by the NIH, the NCI, UCSD and the Academia Sinica of Taiwan.

== Personal life ==
In 1971, while doing her PhD at the UCLA, she married a fellow student, oncologist Stephen P. Staal. The couple had two daughters (Stephanie and Vega Staal), before divorcing around 1990. Wong-Staal later re-married to neurologist Jeffrey McKelvy, with whom she founded Immusol. She had four grandchildren.

Wong-Staal died on July 8, 2020, at the age of 73, at Jacobs Medical Center in La Jolla, due to complications caused by pneumonia.

== See also ==
- Timeline of women in science
