= NUN buffer =

NUN buffer is a solution that makes it possible to purify proteins located in the nucleus of eukaryotic cells. Although other procedures are available they result in loss of albumin D-box binding protein (DBP) which is unwanted if nuclear signal pathways are to be investigated. Therefore, a new extraction procedure was developed in 1993 to increase recovery of nonhistone proteins using a (NUN) solution containing 0.3 M NaCl, 1 M urea, and 1% nonionic detergent Nonidet P-40, which destabilize salt bridges, hydrogen bonds, and hydrophobic interactions, respectively; resulting in a disruption of interaction between proteins and DNA. By incubating nuclei in NUN buffer and centrifuging the solution, the supernatant will therefore contain nuclear proteins.

NUN buffer contains: HEPES [pH 7.6], Urea, NaCl, DDT, PIC 1 & 2, 1.1% NP-40, Sodium orthovanadate, β-glycerol phosphate and water.
