= N-acylneuraminate-9-phosphatase =

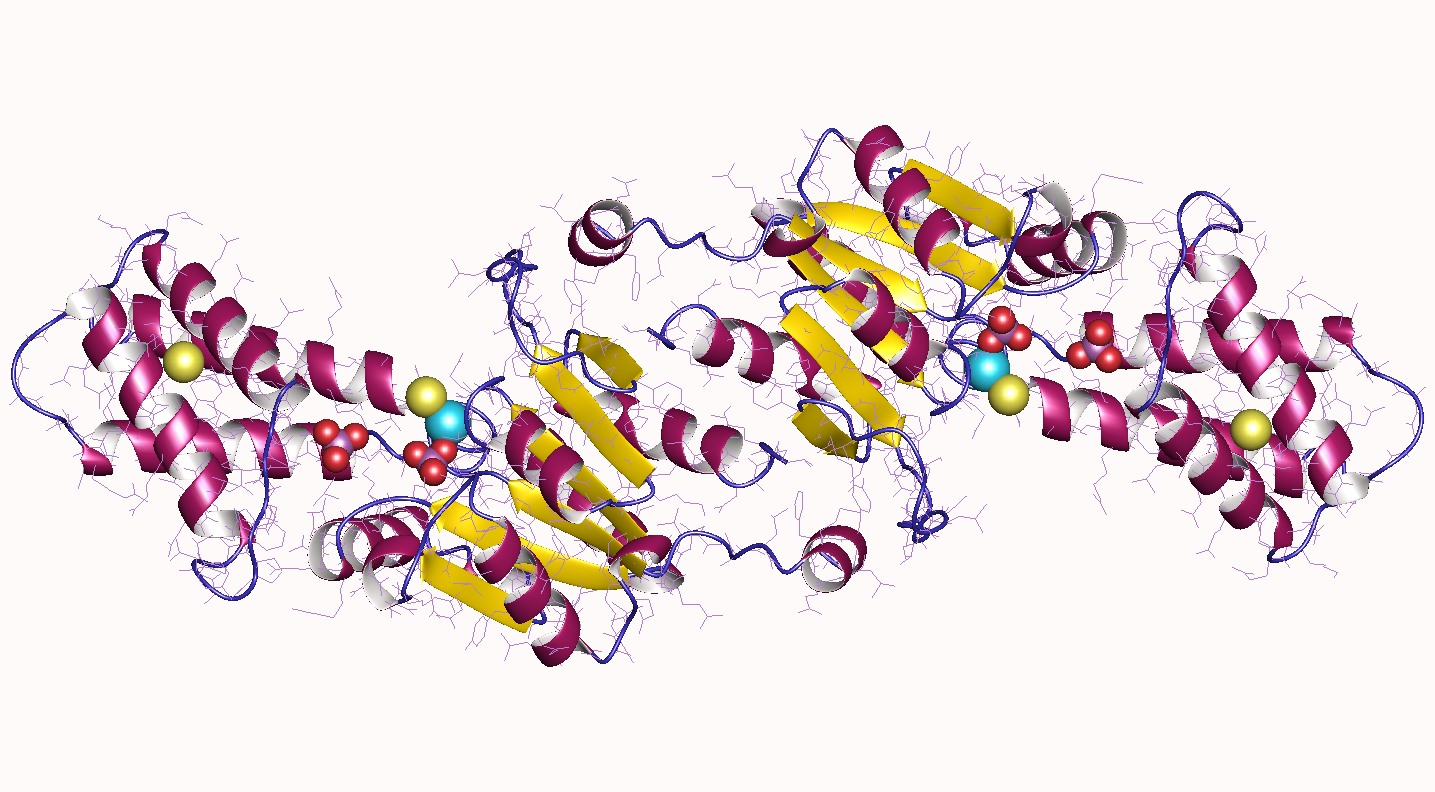
- N-acylneuraminate-9-phosphatase homodimer, Human

Identifiers
- EC no.: 3.1.3.29
- CAS no.: 37288-13-4

Databases
- IntEnz: IntEnz view
- BRENDA: BRENDA entry
- ExPASy: NiceZyme view
- KEGG: KEGG entry
- MetaCyc: metabolic pathway
- PRIAM: profile
- PDB structures: RCSB PDB PDBe PDBsum
- Gene Ontology: AmiGO / QuickGO
Search
- PMC: articles
- PubMed: articles
- NCBI: proteins

The enzyme N-acylneuraminate-9-phosphatase (EC 3.1.3.29) catalyzes the reaction

N-acylneuraminate 9-phosphate + H_{2}O $\rightleftharpoons$ N-acylneuraminate + phosphate

This enzyme belongs to the family of hydrolases, specifically those acting on phosphoric monoester bonds. The systematic name is N-acylneuraminate-9-phosphate phosphohydrolase. Other names in common use include acylneuraminate 9-phosphatase, N-acylneuraminic acid 9-phosphate phosphatase, and N-acylneuraminic (sialic) acid 9-phosphatase. This enzyme participates in aminosugars metabolism.
