= Glucosamine N-acetyltransferase =

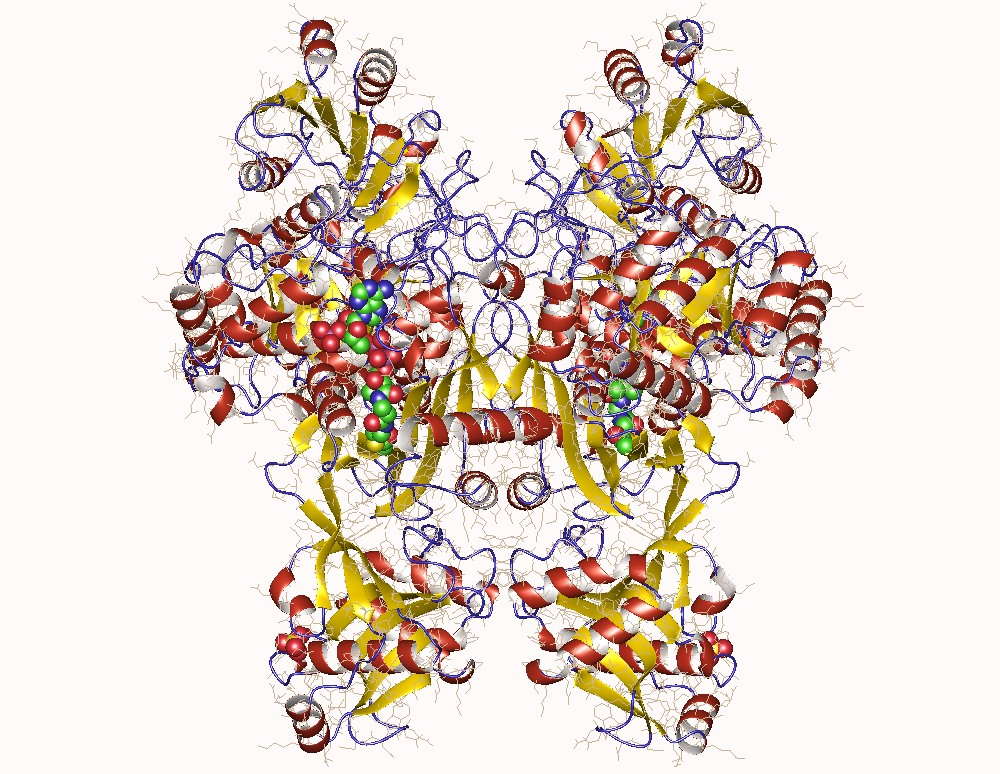
- Glucosamine N-acetyltransferase homodimer, Rhizomucor miehei

Identifiers
- EC no.: 2.3.1.3
- CAS no.: 9032-94-4

Databases
- IntEnz: IntEnz view
- BRENDA: BRENDA entry
- ExPASy: NiceZyme view
- KEGG: KEGG entry
- MetaCyc: metabolic pathway
- PRIAM: profile
- PDB structures: RCSB PDB PDBe PDBsum
- Gene Ontology: AmiGO / QuickGO
Search
- PMC: articles
- PubMed: articles
- NCBI: proteins

Glucosamine N-acetyltransferase (EC 2.3.1.3) is an enzyme that catalyzes the chemical reaction

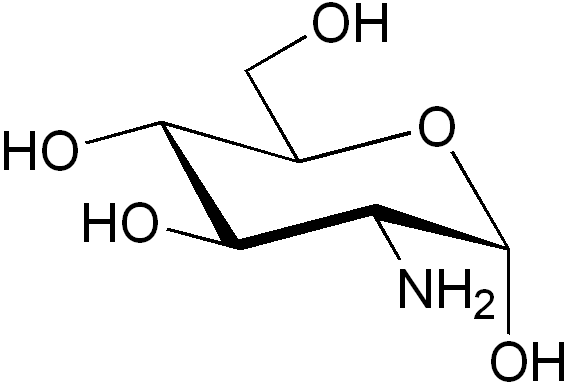
Glucosamine
+
acetyl-CoA
N-Acetylglucosamine
+ coenzyme A

The two substrates of this enzyme are D-glucosamine and acetyl-CoA. Its products are N-acetylglucosamine and coenzyme A.

This enzyme belongs to the family of transferases, specifically those acyltransferases transferring groups other than aminoacyl groups. The systematic name of this enzyme class is acetyl-CoA:D-glucosamine N-acetyltransferase. Other names in common use include glucosamine acetylase, and glucosamine acetyltransferase. It participates in the metabolism of amino sugars.
