= UDP-N-acetylglucosamine 6-dehydrogenase =

Class of enzymes

Identifiers
- EC no.: 1.1.1.136
- CAS no.: 9054-83-5

Databases
- IntEnz: IntEnz view
- BRENDA: BRENDA entry
- ExPASy: NiceZyme view
- KEGG: KEGG entry
- MetaCyc: metabolic pathway
- PRIAM: profile
- PDB structures: RCSB PDB PDBe PDBsum
- Gene Ontology: AmiGO / QuickGO
Search
- PMC: articles
- PubMed: articles
- NCBI: proteins

In enzymology, an UDP-N-acetylglucosamine 6-dehydrogenase (EC 1.1.1.136) is an enzyme that catalyzes the chemical reaction

UDP-N-acetyl-D-glucosamine + 2 NAD^{+} + H_{2}O $\rightleftharpoons$ UDP-N-acetyl-2-amino-2-deoxy-D-glucuronate + 2 NADH + 2 H^{+}

The 3 substrates of this enzyme are UDP-N-acetyl-D-glucosamine, NAD^{+}, and H_{2}O, whereas its 3 products are UDP-N-acetyl-2-amino-2-deoxy-D-glucuronate, NADH, and H^{+}.

This enzyme belongs to the family of oxidoreductases, specifically those acting on the CH-OH group of donor with NAD^{+} or NADP^{+} as acceptor. The systematic name of this enzyme class is UDP-N-acetyl-D-glucosamine:NAD^{+} 6-oxidoreductase. Other names in common use include uridine diphosphoacetylglucosamine dehydrogenase, UDP-acetylglucosamine dehydrogenase, UDP-2-acetamido-2-deoxy-D-glucose:NAD oxidoreductase, and UDP-GlcNAc dehydrogenase. This enzyme participates in aminosugars metabolism.
