= N-acylneuraminate-9-phosphate synthase =

Class of enzymes

Identifiers
- EC no.: 2.5.1.57
- CAS no.: 9031-58-7

Databases
- IntEnz: IntEnz view
- BRENDA: BRENDA entry
- ExPASy: NiceZyme view
- KEGG: KEGG entry
- MetaCyc: metabolic pathway
- PRIAM: profile
- PDB structures: RCSB PDB PDBe PDBsum
- Gene Ontology: AmiGO / QuickGO
Search
- PMC: articles
- PubMed: articles
- NCBI: proteins

In enzymology, a N-acylneuraminate-9-phosphate synthase (EC 2.5.1.57) is an enzyme that catalyzes the chemical reaction

phosphoenolpyruvate + N-acyl-D-mannosamine 6-phosphate + H_{2}O $\rightleftharpoons$ N-acylneuraminate 9-phosphate + phosphate

The 3 substrates of this enzyme are phosphoenolpyruvate, N-acyl-D-mannosamine 6-phosphate, and H_{2}O, whereas its two products are N-acylneuraminate 9-phosphate and phosphate.

This enzyme belongs to the family of transferases, specifically those transferring aryl or alkyl groups other than methyl groups. The systematic name of this enzyme class is phosphoenolpyruvate:N-acyl-D-mannosamine-6-phosphate 1-(2-carboxy-2-oxoethyl)transferase. Other names in common use include N-acetylneuraminate 9-phosphate lyase, N-acetylneuraminate 9-phosphate sialic acid 9-phosphate synthase, N-acetylneuraminate 9-phosphate synthetase, N-acylneuraminate-9-phosphate pyruvate-lyase, (pyruvate-phosphorylating), and sialic acid 9-phosphate synthetase. This enzyme participates in aminosugars metabolism.

== Structural studies ==
As of late 2007, only one structure has been solved for this class of enzymes, with the PDB accession code 1WVO.
