= Virus inactivation =

Technique to prevent viral contamination

Viral inactivation is the process of rendering a virus incapable of causing infection. It plays a critical role across multiple fields, including clinical medicine, diagnostics, research, and the food industry.

In clinical practice, inactivation is essential for preventing viral transmission through blood products—such as transfusions and other biological materials—as well as in biopharmaceutical manufacturing. In diagnostic and research contexts, inactivation enables the safe study and manipulation of viruses without risking transmission to laboratory staff or healthcare personnel. Moreover, in vaccine development, inactivated viruses are employed to stimulate the host immune system, promoting the production of neutralizing antibodies.

A wide range of viral inactivation techniques exist, ranging from physical removal by filtration to mechanical and chemical methods. The choice of technique depends on the specific context and intended purpose. In many situations, a combination of methods is employed—particularly when handling highly pathogenic viruses—where absolute sterility is crucial.

Some of the more common viruses removed by these methods are the HIV-1 and HIV-2 viruses; hepatitis A, B, and C; and parvoviruses.

== Removal ==
This overarching process, which has come to be known simply as virus removal, is one in which all of the viruses in a given sample are removed by traditional extraction or [full energy] methods. Some of the more prominent methods include:

- Nanofiltration
- Chromatography

These extraction processes are considered "traditional processes" because they do not chemically affect the virus in any way; they simply remove it physically from the sample.

=== Nanofiltration ===
Virus removal processes using nanofiltration techniques remove viruses specifically by size exclusion. This type of process is typically used for parvoviruses and other viruses containing a protein coat. A typical HIV virion is 180 nm and a typical parvovirus can vary between 15 and 24 nm, which is very small. One great advantage of filtration, as opposed to methods involving extremes of temperature or acidity, is that filtration will not denature the proteins in the sample. Nanofiltration is also effective for most types of proteins. Since it is not chemically selective, no matter what the surface chemistry of the viral particle is, viral removal processes using nanofiltration techniques will still be effective. Another great advantage of this technique is its ability to be performed on a lab scale and then effectively scaled up to production standards. It is important to consider, however, the fact that the level of removal of the viruses is dependent on the size of the pores of the nanofilter. In some cases, very small viruses will not be filtered out. It is also necessary to consider the possible effects of pressure and flow rate variation.

Some of the filters used for to perform these types of processes are Planova 15N, Planova 20N, BioEX, VAG - 300, Viresolve 180, Viresolve 70TM, and the Virosart range.

=== Chromatography ===
Chromatographic methods of removing viruses are great for purifying the protein and are also effective against all types of viruses, but the level of virus removal is dependent on the column composition and the reagents that are used in the process. The effectiveness of this process can vary greatly between viruses and its efficiency can change based on the buffer used. Sanitation between batches is also a concern when performing this procedure.

Membrane chromatography is increasingly popular for virus purification and removal.

== Inactivation ==
The study and manipulation of viruses, regardless of application, often requires a preceding inactivation step. The goal is to render the virus safe and non-infectious while preserving sufficient structural integrity to allow meaningful analysis.

For serological studies, the preservation of surface epitopes is critical, as these protruding viral structures mediate antibody binding. Antigenicity is particularly important in vaccine development, where efficacy depends on eliciting a significant host immune response—especially the production of neutralizing antibodies.

In contrast, for molecular studies the preservation of viral genetic material is prioritized, such as RNA or DNA, rather than surface structures. This requirement is central to many microbiological diagnostic methods, including PCR, other amplification techniques, and sequencing.

Virus inactivation can be achieved through physical or chemical methods, and often a combination of approaches is employed. This is especially necessary when working with highly pathogenic viruses, where complete sterility is essential to eliminate the risk of exposure.

Physical inactivation methods include heat (pasteurization), ultraviolet (UV) light, gamma radiation and pH-alteration inactivation. Chemical approaches encompass guanidinium-based chaotropic salts, detergents (e.g., sodium dodecyl sulfate [SDS], methanol, Tween compounds, Triton X-100), β-propiolactone, hydrogen peroxide, and aldehydes (e.g., formaldehyde, paraformaldehyde, glutaraldehyde), as well as aromatic disulfides. In addition, photoactive compounds form a distinct class of chemical agents that require light induction, such as psoralens, 1,5-iodonaphthyl azide, methylene blue, and riboflavin.

=== Solvent/detergent (S/D) inactivation ===
This process, developed by the New York Blood Center, is the most widely used viral inactivation method to date. It is predominantly used in the blood plasma industry, by over 50 organizations worldwide and by the American Red Cross. This process is only effective for viruses enveloped in a lipid coat, however. The detergents used in this method interrupt the interactions between the molecules in the virus's lipid coating. Most enveloped viruses cannot exist without their lipid coating so are destroyed when exposed to these detergents. Other viruses may not be destroyed but they are unable to reproduce rendering them non-infective. The solvent creates an environment in which the aggregation reaction between the lipid coat and the detergent happen more rapidly. The detergent typically used is Triton X-100.

Chemical Structure of Triton X-100 (n = 9-10)

This process has many of the advantages of the "traditional" removal techniques. This process does not denature proteins, because the detergents only affect lipids and lipid derivatives. There is a 100% viral death achieved by this process and the equipment is relatively simple and easy to use. Equipment designed to purify post-virus inactivated material would be necessary to guard against contamination of subsequent process streams.

S/D treatment utilizes readily available and relatively inexpensive reagents, but these reagents must be removed from the product prior to distribution which would require extra process steps. Because this process removes/inactivates the lipid coating of a virus, viruses without any sort of lipid envelope will be unaffected. There is also no inactivation effect by the buffers used in this process.

=== Pasteurization ===
Inactivation of viruses by means of pasteurization can be very effective if the proteins that you are trying to protect are more thermally resistant than the viral impurities with which they are in solution. Some of the more prominent advantages of these types of processes are that they require simple equipment and they are effective for both enveloped and non-enveloped viruses. Because pasteurization involves increasing the temperature of solution to a value that will sufficiently denature the virus, it does not matter whether the virus has an envelope or not because the envelope alone cannot protect the virus from such high temperatures. However, there are some proteins which have been found to act as thermal stabilizers for viruses. Of course, if the target protein is not heat-resistant, using this technique could denature that target protein as well as the viral impurity. Typical incubation lasts for 10 hours and is performed at 60 °C.

=== Acidic pH inactivation ===
Some viruses, when exposed to a low pH, will denature spontaneously. Similar to pasteurization, this technique for viral inactivation is useful if the target protein is more resistant to low pHs than the viral impurity. This technique is effective against enveloped viruses, and the equipment typically used is simple and easy to operate. This type of inactivation method is not as effective for non-enveloped viruses however, and also requires elevated temperatures. So in order to use this method, the target protein must be resistant to low pHs and high temperatures which is unfortunately not the case for many biological proteins. Incubation for this process typically occurs at a pH of 4 and lasts anywhere between 6 hours and 21 days.

Acidic inactivation is commonly used in the manufacturing process for monoclonal antibody based biopharmaceuticals. The process consists of reducing the pH to near or below a pH of 3.6 and incubation for at least thirty minutes at room temperature.

=== Ultraviolet (UV) inactivation ===
UV rays can damage the DNA of living organisms by creating nucleic acid dimers. However, the damages are usually not important due to low penetration of UVs through living tissues. UV rays can be used, however, to inactivate viruses since virus particules are small and the UV rays can reach the genetic material, inducing the dimerisation of nucleic acids. Once the DNA dimerised, the virus particules cannot replicate their genetic material which prevent them from spreading.

UV light in combination with riboflavin has been shown to be effective in reducing pathogens in blood transfusion products. Riboflavin and UV light damages the nucleic acids in viruses, bacteria, parasites, and donor white blood cells rendering them unable to replicate and cause disease.

== Spiking studies ==
In many cases, the concentration of viruses in a given sample is extremely low. In other extraction processes, low levels of impurity may be negligible, but because viruses are infective impurities, even one viral particle may be enough to ruin an entire process chain. It is for this reason that special measures must be taken to determine the appropriate removal or inactivation method for whatever type of virus is being extracted from whatever type of solution.

Spiking studies were created specifically for this purpose. A spiking study is a study done in order to determine the possible methods of viral removal or inactivation. The results of these studies are numerical and, based on these numbers, researchers can determine whether or not the process on which the study was conducted will be suitable for the viruses they are trying to extract and the solution from which they are trying to extract them.

=== The method ===
It has been shown through experimentation, that increasing the viral count (or level of activity) of a sample by a factor of 10^{4} or 10^{5} of the original will only change the virus removal/inactivation ratios by one order of magnitude. From this knowledge, spiking studies have been created in which the virus number (or level of activation) is increased or "spiked" by a factor of 10^{4} or 10^{5} of the original sample. This new high number or level of activity is then run through the process stream and purified. The number or level of activity is taken at the beginning and at the end of the process stream and used in the calculation of Reduction Factor.

=== Reduction factor ===
Reduction factor (RF) for a virus removal or inactivation step is calculated using the following equation:

RF_{step} = log_{10} [(V1 x T1)/(V2 x T2)]

Where: V1 = volume of spiked feedstock prior to the clearance step; T1 = virus concentration of spiked feedstock prior to the clearance step; V2 = volume of material after the clearance step; and T2 = virus concentration of material after the clearance step.

The reduction factor needed for a certain process stream is dependent on many different factors, some of which include:

- The expected initial concentration of virus
- The product being purified
- The infective dose of the virus (for in vivo usage)
- Whether inactivation is a viable alternative to complete removal
- The capabilities of the laboratory
- The relative difficulty of the inactivation or removal method

== Applications ==
This technology has been used extensively in the food and drug industries, but some other applications of viral processing have been:

- Air purification (Millipore)
- Vaccines
- Serological analysis
- Molecular analysis
- Viral sample extraction
- Water purification
- West Nile Virus inactivation
