= Dianhydrohexitols =

Class of chemical compounds

Dianhydrohexitols are heterocyclic compounds with the formula [OCH_{2}CH(OH)CH]_{2}. These diols are colorless solids that are derived from sugars, and thus are of interest as renewable feedstocks.

The three isomers are obtained by double dehydration of hexitols such as mannitol and sorbitol. The hexitols themselves are obtained by hydrogenation of abundant sugars mannose and glucose. Among these diols the 1,4- and 3,6-dianhydrohexitols are well known under the names isosorbide, isoidide, and isomannide.

== 1,4:3,6-dianhydrohexitols ==
Isosorbide	Isoidide	Isomannide
1,4:3,6-dianhydro-D-glucidol	1,4:3,6-dianhydro-L-iditol	1,4:3,6-dianhydro-D-mannitol
