= 1β-Methylseleno-N-acetyl-D-galactosamine =

1β-Methylseleno-N-acetyl-d-galactosamine

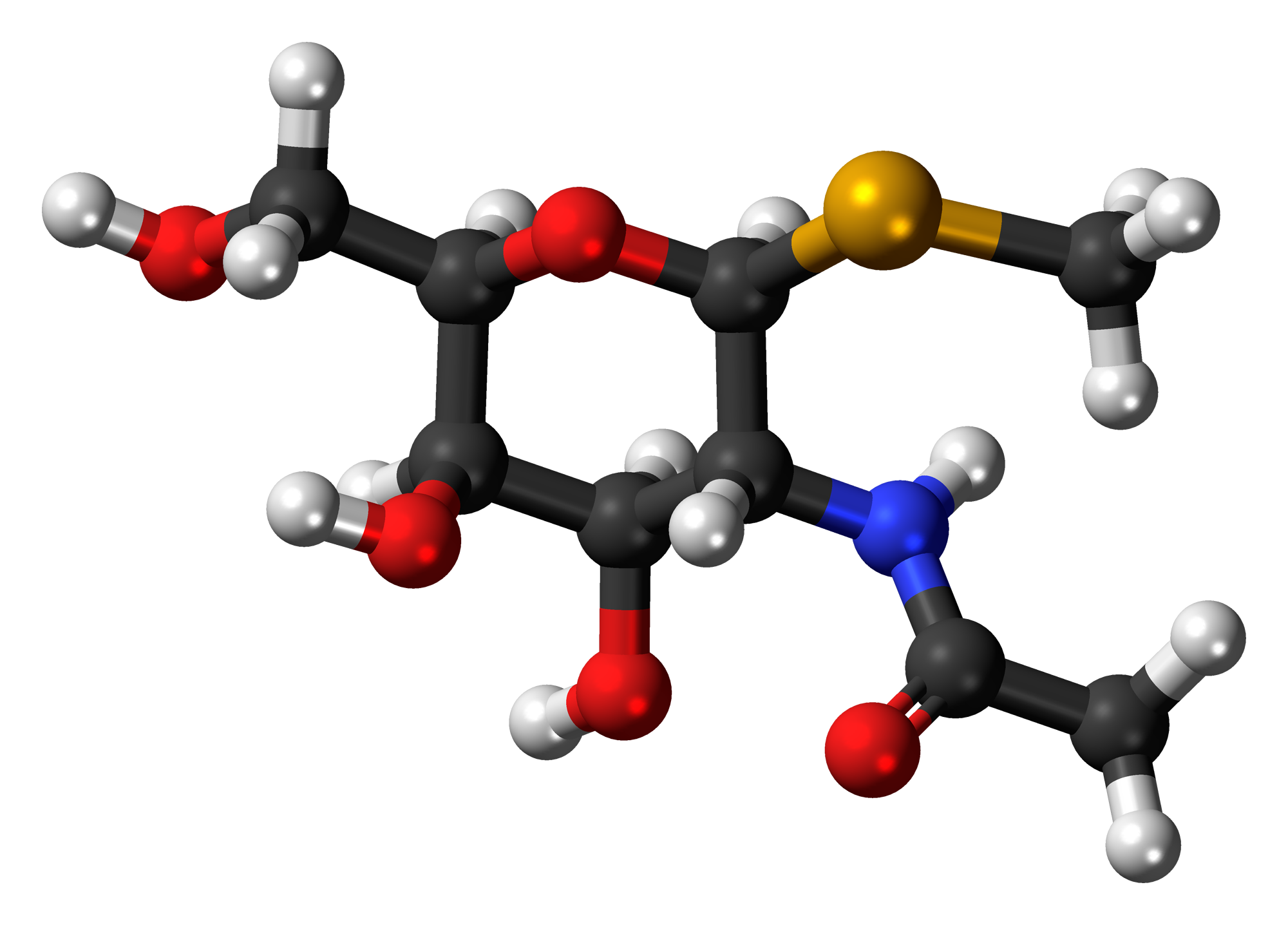

Names
- IUPAC name Methyl 2-(acetylamino)-2-deoxy-1-seleno-β-D-galactopyranoside
- Systematic IUPAC name N-[(2S,3R,4R,5R,6R)-4,5-Dihydroxy-6-(hydroxymethyl)-2-(methylselanyl)oxan-3-yl]acetamide

Identifiers
CAS Number	526222-32-2
3D model (JSmol)	Interactive image
ChemSpider	9725907
PubChem CID	11551129
UNII	ZCQ8TN7ZMH
CompTox Dashboard (EPA)	DTXSID20468461
- InChI: InChI=1S/C9H17NO5Se/c1-4(12)10-6-8(14)7(13)5(3-11)15-9(6)16-2/h5-9,11,13-14H,3H2,1-2H3,(H,10,12)/t5-,6-,7+,8-,9+/m1/s1 Key: AZZZNYGPGINRNT-ZEBDFXRSSA-N
- SMILES: O[C@H]1[C@@H](O)[C@@H](CO)O[C@@H]([Se]C)[C@@H]1NC(C)=O

Properties
Chemical formula	C_{9}H_{17}NO_{5}Se
Molar mass	298.208 g·mol^{−1}
- Except where otherwise noted, data are given for materials in their standard state (at 25 °C [77 °F], 100 kPa). Infobox references

In organic chemistry, 1β-Methylseleno-N-acetyl-D-galactosamine is an amino sugar containing selenium. It is found in urine, as a disposal metabolite for selenium.

== See also ==
- List of sugars
