= Lysis buffer =

Buffer to break cells in molecular biology

A lysis buffer is a buffer solution used for the purpose of breaking open cells for use in molecular biology experiments that analyze the labile macromolecules of the cells (e.g. western blot for protein, or for DNA extraction). Most lysis buffers contain buffering salts (e.g. Tris-HCl) and ionic salts (e.g. NaCl) to regulate the pH and osmolarity of the lysate. Sometimes detergents (such as Triton X-100 or SDS) are added to break up membrane structures. For lysis buffers targeted at protein extraction, protease inhibitors are often included, and in difficult cases may be almost required. Lysis buffers can be used on both animal and plant tissue cells.

== Choosing a buffer ==
The primary purpose of lysis buffer is isolating the molecules of interest and keeping them in a stable environment. For proteins, for some experiments, the target proteins should be completely denatured, while in some other experiments the target protein should remain folded and functional. Different proteins also have different properties and are found in different cellular environments. Thus, it is essential to choose the best buffer based on the purpose and design of the experiments. The important factors to be considered are: pH, ionic strength, usage of detergent, protease inhibitors to prevent proteolytic processes. For example, detergent addition is necessary when lysing Gram-negative bacteria, but not for Gram-positive bacteria. It is common that a protease inhibitor is added to lysis buffer, along with other enzyme inhibitors of choice, such as a phosphatase inhibitor when studying proteins with phosphorylation.

== Components ==
=== Buffer ===
Buffer creates an environment for isolated proteins. Each buffer choice has a specific pH range, so the buffer should be chosen based on whether the experiment's target protein is stable under a certain pH. Also, for buffers with similar pH ranges, it is important to consider whether the buffer is compatible with the experiment's target protein. The table below contains several most commonly used buffers and their pH ranges.

| Buffer | pH Range |
|---|---|
| Sodium dihydrogen phosphate / disodium hydrogen phosphate | 5.8 - 8.0 |
| Tris - HCl | 7.0 - 9.0 |
| HEPES - NaOH | 7.2 - 8.2 |

=== Additives ===
==== Salts ====
Lysis buffer usually contains one or more salts. The function of salts in lysis buffer is to establish an ionic strength in the buffer solution. Some of the most commonly used salts are NaCl, KCl, and (NH_{4})_{2}SO_{4.} They are usually used with a concentration between 50 and 150 mM.

Sodium dodecyl sulfate (SDS) structure

==== Detergent ====
Triton X-100 structure

Detergents are organic amphipathic (with hydrophobic tail and a hydrophilic head) surfactants. They are used to separate membrane proteins from membrane because the hydrophobic part of detergent can surround biological membranes and thus isolate membrane proteins from membranes. Although detergents are widely used and have similar functions, the physical and chemical properties of detergents of interest must be considered in light of the goals of an experiment.

Detergents are often categorized as nonionic, anionic, cationic, or zwitterionic, based on their hydrophilic head group feature.

Nonionic detergents like Triton X-100 and zwitterionic detergents like CHAPS (3-[(3-cholamidopropyl)dimethylammonio]-1-propanesulfonate) are nondenaturing (will not disrupt protein functions). Ionic detergents like sodium dodecyl sulfate (SDS) and cationic detergents like ethyl trimethyl ammonium bromide are denaturing (will disrupt protein functions). Detergents are a major ingredient that determines the lysis strength of a given lysis buffer.

==== Detergent-Free Cell Lysis Buffers ====
One common issue faced by many cell lysis buffers is the disruption of protein structures during the lysis process, partially caused by use of detergents. Detergents often prevent the restoration of native conditions necessary for proper protein folding.

For the longest time, after a detergent-based cell lysis, a buffer exchange and/or dialysis had to be performed to remove the detergent among other hindering compounds to restore native conditions.

To overcome this a solution has emerged in the form of a detergent-free cell lysis buffer. The GentleLys buffer employs copolymers instead of detergents, ensuring efficient cell lysis while maintaining the native environment crucial for the correct folding of cellular components, such as proteins.

==== Others ====
Other additives include metal ions, sugar like glucose, glycerol, metal chelators (e.g. EDTA), and reducing agents like dithiothreitol (DTT).

== Commonly used buffers ==
=== NP-40 lysis buffer ===
It may be the most widely used lysis buffer. The solubilizing agent is NP-40, which can be replaced by other detergents at different concentrations. Since NP-40 is a nonionic detergent, this lysis buffer has a milder effect than RIPA buffer. It can be used when protein functions are to be retained with minimal disruption.

Recipe:

- 150 mM NaCl
- 1.0% Nonidet P-40 or Triton X-100
- 50 mM Tris-Cl
- Adjust pH to 7.4

=== RIPA (RadioImmunoPrecipitation Assay) lysis buffer ===
RIPA buffer is a commonly used lysis buffer for immunoprecipitation and general protein extraction from cells and tissues. The buffer can be stored without vanadate at 4 °C for up to 1 year. RIPA buffer releases proteins from cells as well as disrupts most weak interactions between proteins.

Recipe:

- 1% (w/w) Nonidet P-40 (NP-40)
- 1% (w/v) sodium deoxycholate
- 0.1% (w/v) SDS
- 0.15 M NaCl
- 0.01 M sodium phosphate, pH 7.2
- 2 mM EDTA
- 50 mM sodium fluoride (NaF)
- 0.2 mM fresh sodium orthovanadate (Na_{3}VO_{4}.2H_{2}O, it has phosphatase inhibitor function because it mimics phosphate)
- 100 U/ml protease inhibitor, such as aprotinin

=== SDS (sodium dodecyl sulfate) lysis buffer ===
SDS is ionic denaturing detergent. Hot SDS buffer is often used when the proteins need to be completely solubilized and denatured.

Recipe:

- 0.5% (w/v) SDS
- 0.05 M Tris⋅Cl
- Adjust pH to 8.0
- Add 1 mM fresh dithiothreitol (DTT)

=== ACK (Ammonium-Chloride-Potassium) lysing buffer ===
ACK is used for lysis of red blood cells in biological samples where other cells such as white blood cells are of greater interest.

Recipe:

- 150 mM ammonium chloride
- 10 mM potassium bicarbonate
- 0.1 mM EDTA
- Adjust pH to 7.2-7.4

=== GentleLys (Gentle Lysis) ===
The GentleLys buffer employs synthetic nanodisc copolymers to gently disrupt the cell membrane, offering a milder alternative to conventional detergent-based lysis buffers. This gentle approach eliminates the need for harsh chemicals, creating an environment that preserves the native state of cellular proteins. Consequently, the proteins maintain their structural integrity and functionality, a marked departure from the denaturing effects of detergent-based buffers.

== Detergents, salts & enzymes ==
Cell lysis is a critical step in the purification of enzymes from bacterial cells, various components are commonly included in lysing buffers to facilitate effective cell disruption and release of the target enzyme. These components include detergents, salts, and enzymes, each playing a specific role in the lysis process. Examples of detergents used in lysing buffers include:

Detergents:

Detergents are amphipathic molecules that possess both hydrophilic and hydrophobic properties. In the context of cell lysis, detergents act by disrupting the lipid bilayer of the bacterial cell membrane, leading to membrane permeabilization and release of intracellular components, including the target enzyme.

Commonly used detergents in lysing buffers include:

a. Triton X-100: a nonionic detergent frequently employed due to its mild and effective membrane-disrupting properties, it solubilizes lipids and membrane proteins, allowing the release of intracellular contents.

b. Sodium dodecyl sulfate (SDS): an anionic detergent that denatures proteins by disrupting their secondary and tertiary structures, it solubilizes cellular membranes and aids in protein extraction.

c. Tween-20: a nonionic detergent is milder compared to SDS and Triton X-100. It assists in membrane permeabilization and solubilization of proteins without causing significant denaturation.

Salts:

Salts are crucial components of lysing buffers as they help maintain optimal cellular conditions and provide ionic strength to facilitate cell disruption.

Commonly used salts in lysing buffers include:

a. Sodium chloride (NaCl): NaCl is often included to maintain isotonic conditions, preventing osmotic shock and cell rupture during the lysis process.

b. Potassium chloride (KCl): Similar to NaCl, KCl can be used to adjust the ionic strength and facilitate cell lysis.

Enzymes:

Certain enzymes are added to lysing buffers to enhance cell lysis by digesting specific cellular components that can interfere with the extraction of the target enzyme.

Examples of enzymes used in lysing buffers include:

a. Lysozyme: Lysozyme breaks down the peptidoglycan layer of bacterial cell walls, weakening their structural integrity and facilitating subsequent disruption. It is particularly effective for Gram-positive bacteria.

b. DNase (Deoxyribonuclease): DNase degrades DNA present in the lysate, reducing its viscosity and preventing DNA-related interference in downstream purification steps.

c. RNase (Ribonuclease): Similar to DNase, RNase degrades RNA in the lysate, reducing its viscosity and minimizing RNA-related interference.

The specific combination and concentrations of detergents, salts, and enzymes in lysing buffers can vary depending on the target enzyme, cell type, and experimental requirements, optimization of these components is crucial to achieve efficient cell lysis while preserving the stability and activity of the desired enzyme during the purification process.

== Lysis buffer in DNA and RNA studies ==
In studies like DNA fingerprinting the lysis buffer is used for DNA isolation. Dish soap can be used in a pinch to break down the cell and nuclear membranes, allowing the DNA to be released. Other such lysis buffers include the proprietary Qiagen product Buffer P2.
