= Sorbitan =

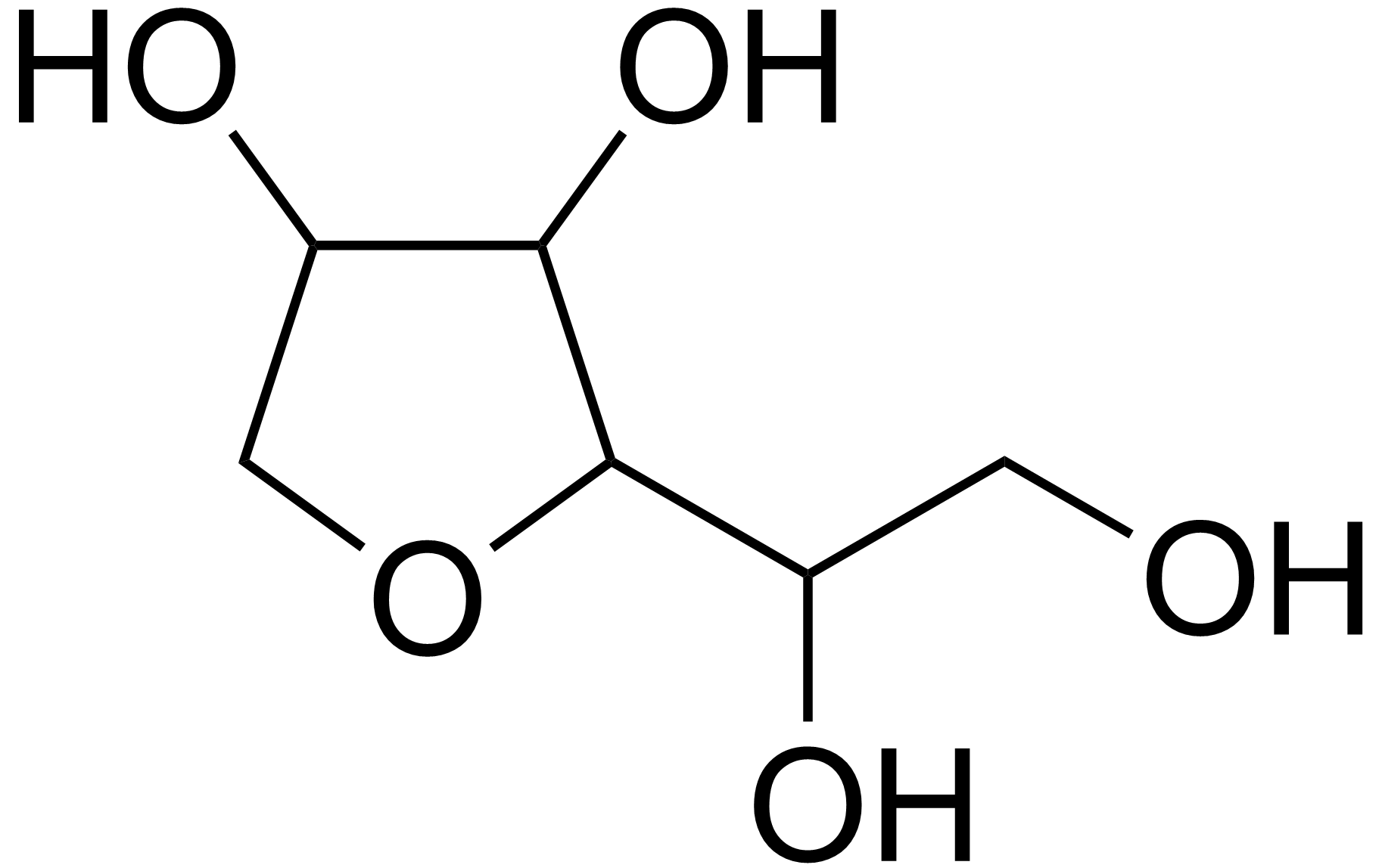

Names
- IUPAC name (3S)-2-(1,2-Dihydroxyethyl)tetrahydrofuran-3,4-diol
- Other names 1,4-anhydrosorbitol

Identifiers
CAS Number	12441-09-7
3D model (JSmol)	Interactive image
ChemSpider	none
DrugBank	DB14474
ECHA InfoCard	100.032.415
EC Number	235-671-0
PubChem CID	103023
UNII	6O92ICV9RU
CompTox Dashboard (EPA)	DTXSID00872901
- InChI: InChI=1S/C6H12O5/c7-1-3(8)6-5(10)4(9)2-11-6/h3-10H,1-2H2/t3?,4?,5-,6?/m0/s1 Key: JNYAEWCLZODPBN-CTQIIAAMSA-N
- SMILES: C1C([C@@H](C(O1)C(CO)O)O)O

Properties
Chemical formula	C_{6}H_{12}O_{5}
Molar mass	164.16 g/mol
Appearance	colourless solid
- Except where otherwise noted, data are given for materials in their standard state (at 25 °C [77 °F], 100 kPa). verify (what is ?) Infobox references

Sorbitan is a mixture of isomeric organic compounds derived from the dehydration of sorbitol and is an intermediate in the conversion of sorbitol to isosorbide. Sorbitan is primarily used in the production of surfactants such as polysorbates; which are important emulsifying agents, with a total annual demand of more than 10,000 tons in 2012. Sorbitan and Sorbitol esters are an uncommon allergen.

== Synthesis ==
Sorbitan is produced by the dehydration of sorbitol and is an intermediate in the conversion of sorbitol to isosorbide. The dehydration reaction usually produces sorbitan as a mixture of five- and six-membered cyclic ethers (1,4-anhydrosorbitol, 1,5-anhydrosorbitol and 1,4,3,6-dianhydrosorbitol) with the five-membered 1,4-anhydrosorbitol form being the dominant product. The rate of formation of sorbitan is typically greater than that of isosorbide, which allows it to be produced selectively, providing the reaction conditions are carefully controlled. The dehydration reaction has been shown to work even in the presence of excess water.

== Surfactant derivatives ==
=== Esters ===
Sorbitan esters (also known as Spans) are nonionic surfactants that are used as emulsifying agents in the preparation of emulsions, creams, and ointments for pharmaceutical and cosmetic use. When used alone they produce stable water-in-oil emulsions but they are frequently used with a polysorbate in varying proportions to produce water-in-oil or oil-in-water emulsions or creams with a variety of different textures and consistencies. Sorbitan esters are also used as emulsifiers and stabilisers in food.

Sorbitan esters (Spans)

Sorbitan monostearate (Span 60, E number: E491)

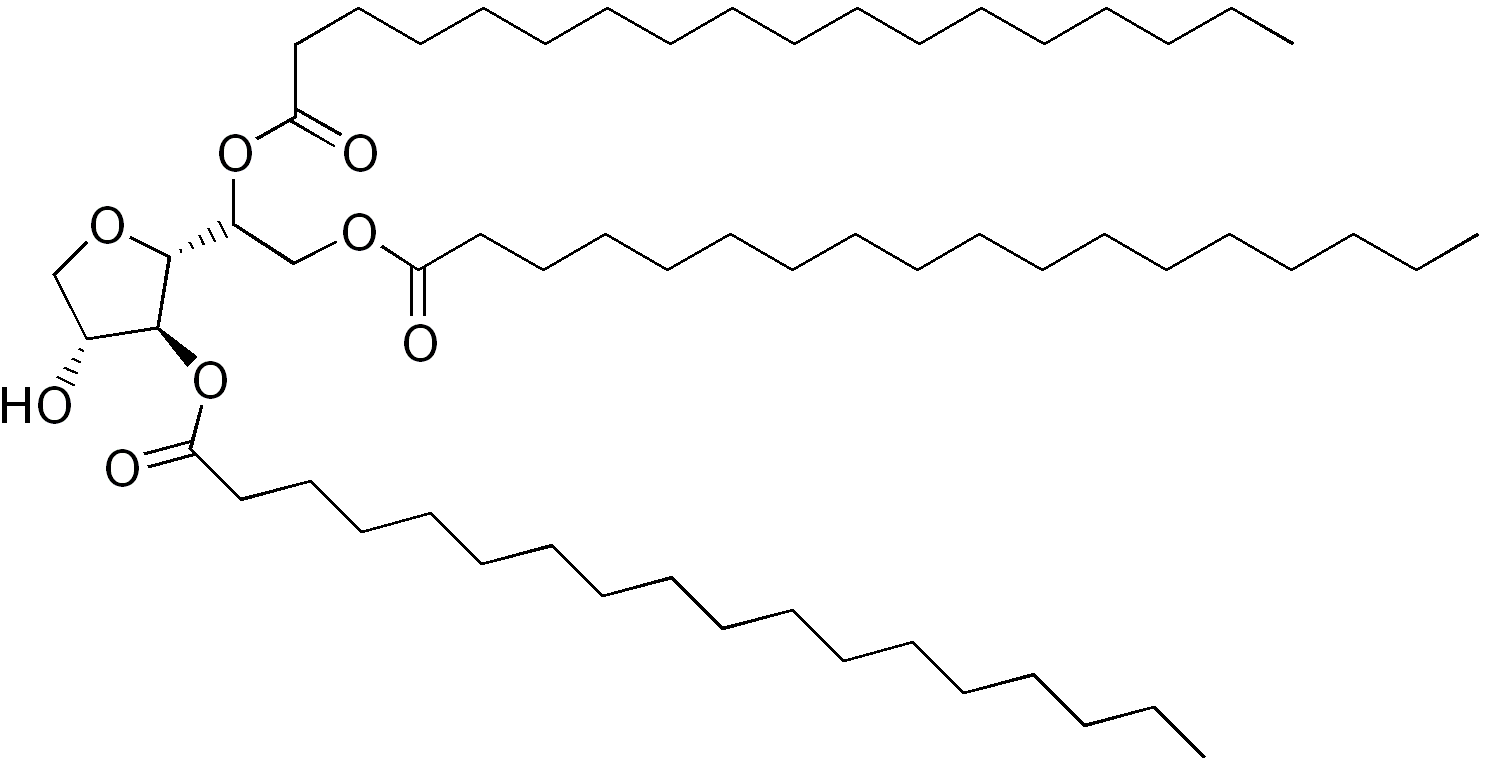
Sorbitan tristearate (Span 65, E number: E492)

Sorbitan monolaurate (Span 20, E number: E493)

=== Polysorbate ===
Ethoxylated sorbitan esters are known as polysorbates (trade name: Tweens). They are an important class of emulsifiers used in a variety of settings, including pharmaceuticals and food.

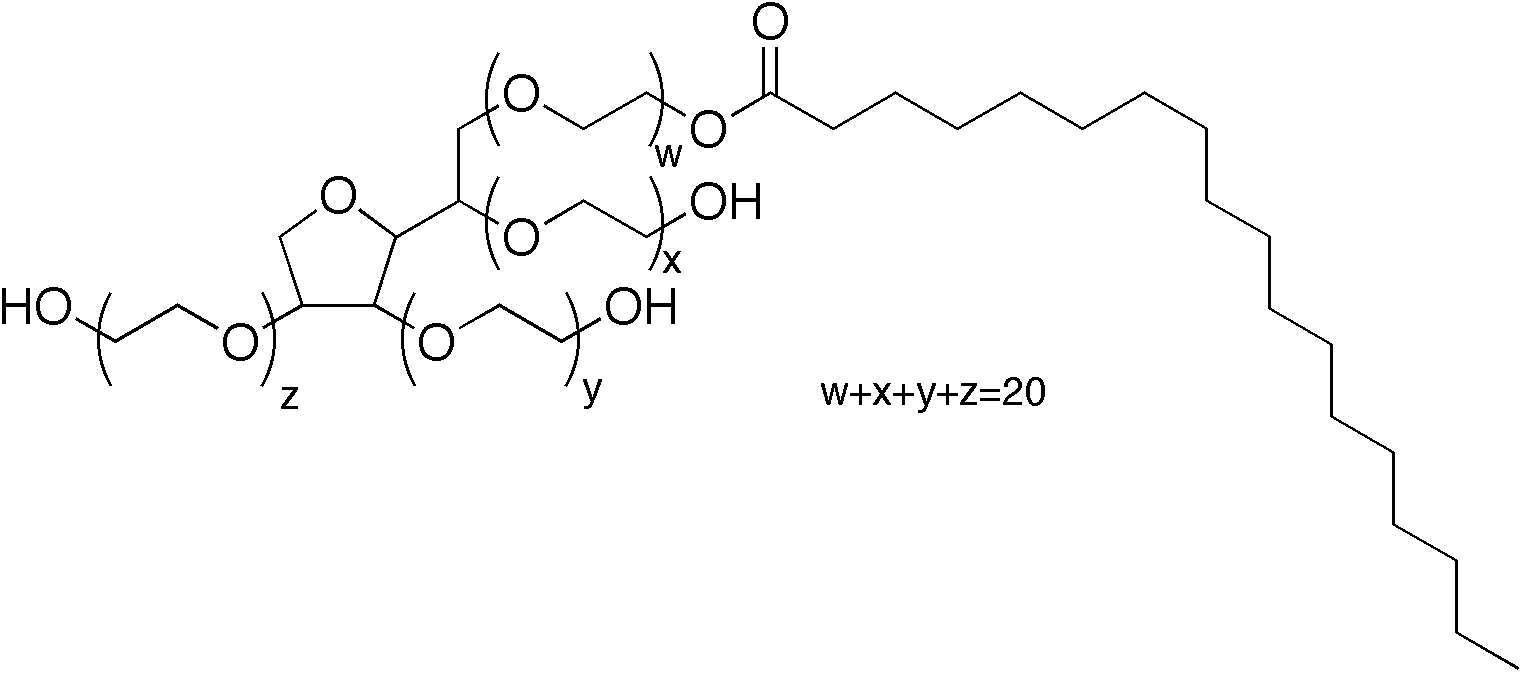
The general structure of polysorbate
