= Polysorbate 20 =

Chemical substance

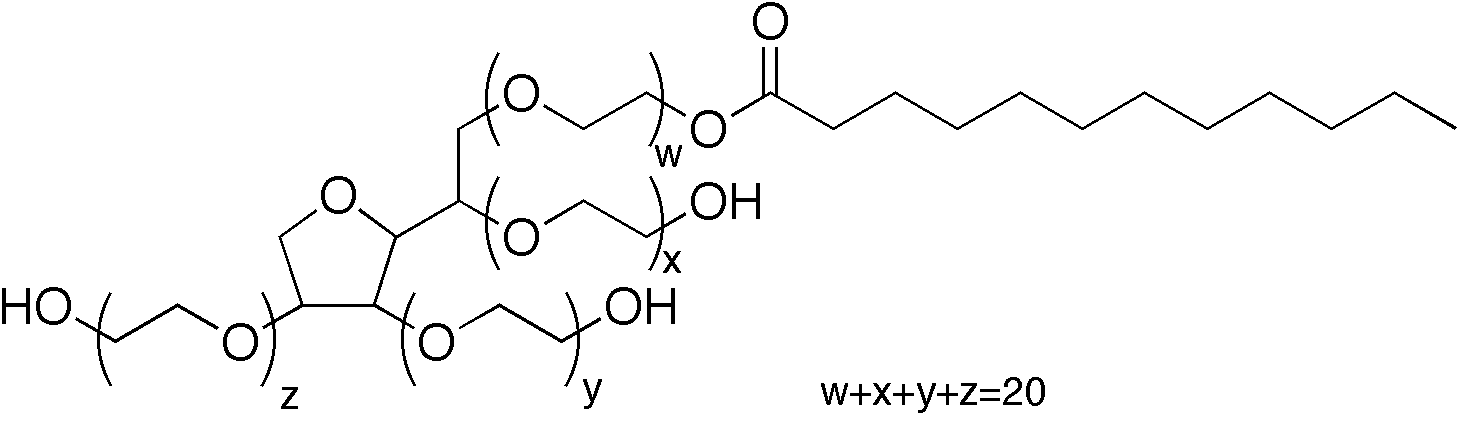
- Polysorbate 20

Names
- IUPAC name Polyoxyethylene (20) sorbitan monolaurate
- Other names: Kolliphor PS 20; Montanox 20; Polysorbate 20; PEG(20)sorbitan monolaurate; Alkest TW 20; Tween 20; Kotilen-20

Identifiers
CAS Number	9005-64-5
ChemSpider	none
ECHA InfoCard	100.105.528
E number	E432 (thickeners, ...)
RTECS number	TR7400000
UNII	239B50Y732
CompTox Dashboard (EPA)	DTXSID3031949

Properties
Chemical formula	C_{58}H_{114}O_{26}
Molar mass	1226 g/mol
Appearance	Clear, yellow to yellow-green viscous liquid.
Density	1.1 g/mL (approximate)
Boiling point	> 100 °C (212 °F; 373 K)
- Surface tension
CMC	8.04×10^{−5} M at 21 °C
HLB	16.7

Hazards
- Occupational safety and health (OHS/OSH)
Main hazards	Irritant
NFPA 704 (fire diamond)	1
Flash point	110 °C (230 °F; 383 K)
Safety data sheet (SDS)	External MSDS
- Except where otherwise noted, data are given for materials in their standard state (at 25 °C [77 °F], 100 kPa). verify (what is ?) Infobox references

Polysorbate 20 (common commercial brand names include Kolliphor PS 20, Scattics, Alkest TW 20, Tween 20, and Kotilen-20) is a polysorbate-type nonionic surfactant formed by the ethoxylation of sorbitan monolaurate. Its stability and relative nontoxicity allows it to be used as a detergent and emulsifier in a number of domestic, scientific, and pharmacological applications. As the name implies, the ethoxylation process leaves the molecule with 20 repeat units of polyethylene glycol; in practice these are distributed across 4 different chains, leading to a commercial product containing a range of chemical species.

== Food applications ==
Polysorbate 20 is used as a wetting agent in flavored mouth drops such as Ice Drops, helping to provide a spreading feeling to other ingredients like SD alcohol and mint flavor.

The World Health Organization has suggested acceptable daily intake limits of 0–25 mg of polyoxyethylene sorbitan esters per kg body weight.

== Biotechnical applications ==
In biological techniques and sciences, polysorbate 20 has a broad range of applications. For example, it is used:

- as a washing agent in immunoassays, such as Western blots and ELISAs. It helps to prevent non-specific antibody binding. In this major application, it is dissolved in Tris-buffered saline or phosphate buffered saline at dilutions of 0.05% to 0.5% v/v. These buffers are used for washes between each immunoreaction, to remove unbound immunologicals, and eventually for incubating solutions of immunoreagents (labeled antibodies) to reduce nonspecific background.
- to saturate binding sites on surfaces (i.e., to coat polystyrene microplates, generally combined with proteins such as BSA).
- to stabilize proteins purified protein derivative (PPD) solution used in skin testing for tuberculosis exposure
- as a solubilizing agent of membrane proteins
- for lysing mammalian cells, at a concentration of 0.05% to 0.5% v/v, generally combined with other detergents, salts and additives.

== Pharmaceutical applications ==
Polysorbate 20 is used as an excipient in pharmaceutical applications to stabilize emulsions and suspensions.

== Industrial and domestic applications ==
Polysorbate 20 is used in many brands of baby wipes.

Polysorbate 20 is used by philatelists to remove stamps from envelopes and to remove residues from stamps, without harming the stamp itself.

Polysorbate 20 is also used as wetting agent in rubber balers in the elastomer industry.

Polysorbate 20 has been used as a shape directing agent to synthesize spheroidal magnetite nanoassemblies.

== See also ==
- Polysorbate 80
