= Phenotypic testing of mycobacteria =

In microbiology, the phenotypic testing of mycobacteria uses a number of methods. The most-commonly used phenotypic tests to identify and distinguish Mycobacterium strains and species from each other are described below.

== Tests ==
Acetamide as sole C and N sources

Media: KH_{2}PO_{4} (0.5 g), MgSO>_{4}*7H_{2}0 (0.5 g), purified agar (20 g), distilled water (1000 ml). The medium is supplemented with acetamide to a final concentration of 0.02M, adjusted to a pH of 7.0 and sterilized by autoclaving at 115°C for 30 minutes. After sloping, the medium is inoculated with one loop of the cultures and incubated. Growth is read after incubation for two weeks (rapid growers) or four weeks (slow growers).

Arylsulfatase test

Arylsulfatase enzyme is present in most mycobacteria. The rate by which arylsulfatase enzyme breaks down phenolphthalein disulfate into phenolphthalein (which forms a red color in the presence of sodium bicarbonate) and other salts is used to differentiate certain strains of Mycobacteria. 3 day arylsulfatase test is used to identify potentially pathogenic rapid growers such as M. fortuitum and M. chelonae. Slow growing M. marinum and M. szulgai are positive in the 14-day arylsulfatase test.

Catalase, semiquantitative activity

Most mycobacteria produce the enzyme catalase, but they vary in the quantity produced. Also, some forms of catalase are inactivated by heating at 68°C for 20 minutes (others are stable). Organisms producing the enzyme catalase have the ability to decompose hydrogen peroxide into water and free oxygen. The test differs from that used to detect catalase in other types of bacteria by using 30% hydrogen peroxide in a strong detergent solution (10% polysorbate 80).

Citrate

Sole carbon source

Egg medium

Growth on Löwenstein–Jensen medium (LJ medium)

L-Glutamate

Sole carbon and nitrogen source

Growth rate

The growth rate is the length of time required to form mature colonies visible without magnification on solid media. Mycobacteria forming colonies visible to the naked eye within seven days on subculture are known as rapid growers, while those requiring longer periods are termed slow growers.

Iron uptake

The ability to take up iron from an inorganic iron containing reagent helps differentiate some species of mycobacteria.

Lebek medium

Lebek is a semisolid medium used to test the oxygen preferences of mycobacterial isolates. Aerophilic growth is indicated by growth on (and above) the surface of the glass wall of the tube; microaerophilic growth is indicated by growth below the surface.

MacConkey agar without crystal violet

Niacin accumulation (paper strip method)

Niacin is formed as a metabolic byproduct by all mycobacteria, but some species possess an enzyme that converts free niacin to niacin ribonucleotide. M. tuberculosis (and some other species) lack this enzyme, and accumulate niacin as a water-soluble byproduct in the culture medium.

Nitrate reduction

Mycobacteria containing nitroreductase catalyze the reduction from nitrate to nitrite. The presence of nitrite in the test medium is detected by addition of sulfanilamide and n-naphthylethylendiamine. If nitrate is present, red diazonium dye is formed.

Photoreactivity of mycobacteria;

Some mycobacteria produce carotenoid pigments without light; others require photoactivation for pigment production. Photochromogens produce non-pigmented colonies when grown in the dark, and pigmented colonies after exposure to light and re-incubation. Scotochromogens produce deep-yellow-to-orange colonies when grown in either light or darkness. Non-photochromogens are non-pigmented in light and darkness or have a pale-yellow, buff or tan pigment which does not intensify after light exposure.

Picrate tolerance

Grows on Sauton agar containing picric acid (0.2% w/v) after three weeks

Pigmentation

Some mycobacteria produce carotenoid pigments without light; others require photoactivation for pigment production (see photoreactivity, above).

Pyrazinamide sensitivity (PZA)

The deamidation of pyrazinamide to pyrazinoic acid (assumed to be the active component of the drug pyrazinamide) in four days is a useful physiologic characteristic by which M. tuberculosis-complex members can be distinguished.

Sodium chloride tolerance

Growth on LJ medium containing 5% NaCl

Thiophene-2carboxylic acid hydrazide (TCH) sensitivity

The growth of M. bovis and M. africanum subtype II is inhibited by thiophene-2carboxylic acid hydrazide; growth of M. tuberculosis and M. africanum subtype I is uninhibited.

Polysorbate 80 hydrolysis

A test for lipase using polysorbate 80 (polyoxyethylene sorbitan monooleate, a detergent). Certain mycobacteria possess a lipase that splits it into oleic acid and polyoxyethylated sorbitol. The test solution also contains phenol red, which is stabilised by the polysorbate 80; when the latter 80 is hydrolysed, the phenol red changes from yellow to pink.

Urease (adaptation to mycobacteria)

With an inoculation loop, several loopfuls of mycobacteria test colonies are transferred to 0.5 mL of urease substrate, mixed to emulsify and incubated at 35 °C for three days; a colour change (from amber-yellow to pink-red) is sought.
