= Tweener =

Tweener may refer to:

In sports:

- A shot in racket sports that is performed by hitting the ball between the legs:
  - Tweener (tennis)
  - Tweener (pickleball)
- Tweener, a basketball player able to play two different positions
- Tweener, a professional wrestler portrayed as morally neutral or ambiguous
- Tweener, a bowler whose bowling form falls between accurate stroking and powerful cranking
- Tweener racket, a mid-size, mid-weight tennis racket for intermediate players

Other:

- Tweener (age group)
- “Tweener” (demographic), a generation demographic who do not align with characteristics of either the older Baby Boomer or younger Generation X generations. Sometimes also referred to as “Generation Jones” or “Cuspers”.
- "Tweener", the 9th episode from season 1 of Prison Break
- David "Tweener" Apolskis, a character from the U.S. television series Prison Break

== See also ==
- Tween (disambiguation)
- Inbetweening
