= Alkoxylation =

Chemical reaction

Alkoxylation is a chemical reaction that involves the addition of an epoxide to another compound. The usual manifestation of this reaction is ethoxylation of alcohols (ROH), in which case ethylene oxide is the alkoxylating agent:

ROH + C_{2}H_{4}O → ROCH_{2}CH_{2}OH

Another industrially significant epoxide is propylene oxide (PO, OCH_{2}CHCH_{3}). PO is mainly used for alkoxylation to produce polyether polyols. The alkoxylation process is shown in simplified form:

ROH + n OCH_{2}CHCH_{3} → R(OCH_{2}CHCH_{3})_{n}OH

Polyols derived from PO have complex stereochemistry owing to the chirality of the propylene oxide. These polyols are used on a large scale to produce polyurethanes, by condensation with diisocyanates.
