= Glycal =

Glucal, the glycal formed from glucose

Glycal is a name for cyclic enol ether derivatives of sugars having a double bond between carbon atoms 1 and 2 of the ring. The term "glycal" should not be used for an unsaturated sugar that has a double bond in any position other than between carbon atoms 1 and 2.

== History ==
The first glycal was synthesized by Hermann Emil Fischer and Karl Zach in 1913. They synthesized this 1,2-unsaturated sugar from D-glucose and named their product D-glucal. Fischer believed he had synthesized an aldehyde, and therefore he gave the product a name that suggested this. By the time he discovered his mistake, the name "glycal" was adopted as a general name for all sugars with a double bond between carbon atoms 1 and 2.

== Conformation ==
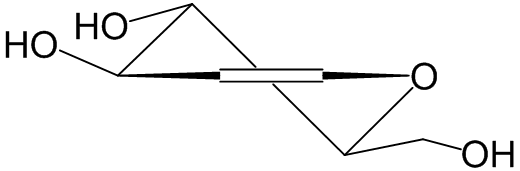
Glucal in its preferred half-chair conformation

Glycals can be formed as pyranose (six-membered) or furanose (five-membered) rings, depending on the monosaccharide used as a starting material to synthesize the glycal. Glycals can also be classified as endo-glycals or exo-glycals. A glycal is an endo-glycal when the double bond is within the ring. If the hydroxyl group on carbon 1 has been replaced with another carbon atom, a double bond can also form outside the ring between carbon 1 and this new carbon. In this case, the product is called an exo-glycal. The glycal conformation that has been studied in most depth is that of the pyranose endo-glycal. The favoured conformation of this glycal is the half-chair, a result which has been confirmed by quantum mechanical calculations.

== Synthesis ==
The original Fischer glycal synthesis was the reductive elimination with zinc of a glycosyl halide. This glycosyl halide was formed from a monosaccharide starting material. Some other synthetic routes include:

- Ring-closing metathesis
- Reaction of thioglycosides with lithium naphthalenide.
- Mesylation of the anomeric hydroxyl and formation of the anomeric palladium complex, which undergoes beta-elimination

A general example of each synthetic route is given below (drawn with first discussed synthesis bottom right, moving clockwise):

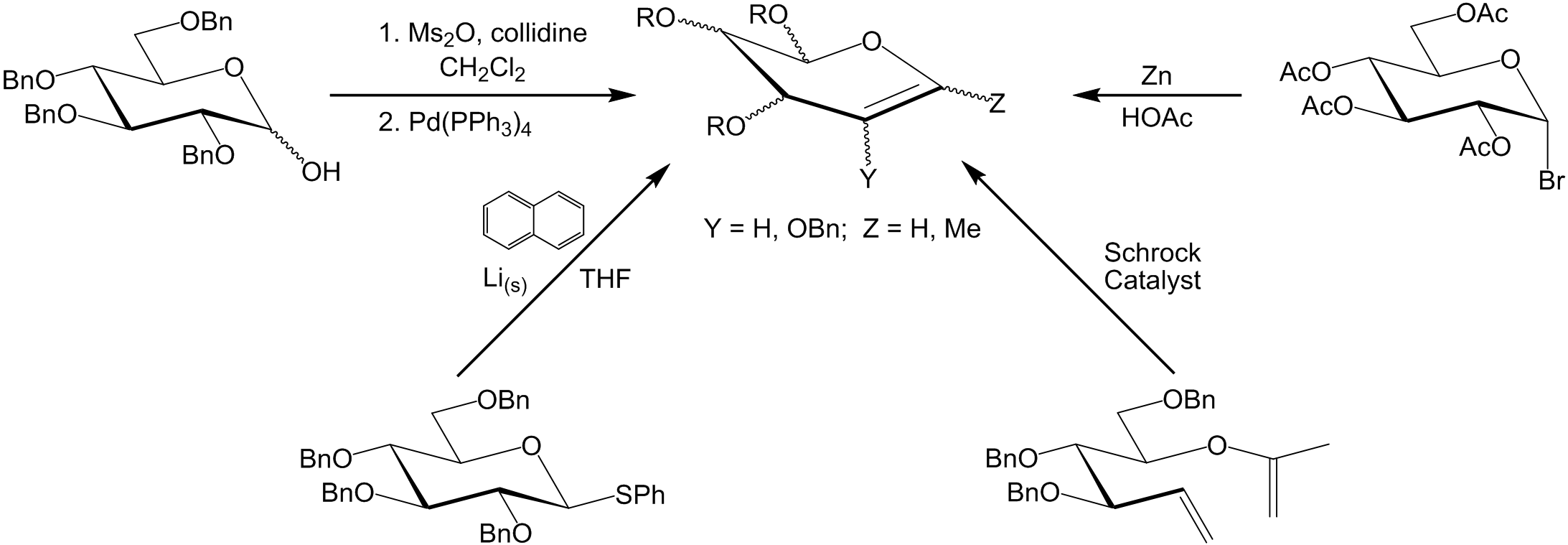
Some available methods to synthesize glycals

== Reactions and uses ==
The double bond of a glycal allows many other functional groups to be introduced into a monosaccharide. Like an alkene, a glycal can undergo electrophilic addition across the double bond to add in these new atoms such as halogens, epoxides, and nitrogen. The glycal double bond also allows a deoxy position (carbon in the ring that doesn’t have an oxygen bonded to it) to be easily introduced.

Glycals have many uses in synthetic carbohydrate chemistry. They are commonly used as glycosylation donors, meaning that they can react with other monosaccharides to form a longer chain of monosaccharides called an oligosaccharide.

Glycals can also have interesting applications in studying biological systems, particularly enzymes. D-glucal and radiolabelled D-galactal have been used to selectively bind with amino acids in the active sites of several enzymes. These enzyme-glycal complexes allow these amino acids that are essential for catalysis to be identified and allow for a better understanding of how these enzymes function.
