= Ethoxylation =

Chemical reaction between ethylene oxide and substrate

In organic chemistry, ethoxylation is a chemical reaction in which ethylene oxide (C_{2}H_{4}O) adds to a substrate. It is the most widely practiced alkoxylation, which involves the addition of epoxides to substrates.

In the usual application, alcohols and phenols are converted into R(OC_{2}H_{4})_{n}OH, where n ranges from 1 to 10. Such compounds are called alcohol ethoxylates. Alcohol ethoxylates are often converted to related species called ethoxysulfates. Alcohol ethoxylates and ethoxysulfates are surfactants, used widely in cosmetic and other commercial products. The process is of great industrial significance, with more than 2,000,000 metric tons of various ethoxylates produced worldwide in 1994.

== Production ==
The process was developed at the Ludwigshafen laboratories of IG Farben by Conrad Schöller and Max Wittwer during the 1930s.

=== Alcohol ethoxylates ===
Industrial ethoxylation is primarily performed upon alcohols. Lower alcohols react to give glycol ethers which are commonly used as solvents, while longer fatty alcohols are converted to fatty alcohol ethoxylates (FAE's), which are a common form of nonionic surfactant. The reaction typically proceeds by blowing ethylene oxide through the alcohol at 180 °C and under 1-2 bar of pressure, with potassium hydroxide (KOH) serving as a catalyst. The process is highly exothermic (ΔH = -92 kJ/mol of ethylene oxide reacted) and requires careful control to avoid a potentially disastrous thermal runaway.

R−OH + n C_{2}H_{4}O → R−(OC_{2}H_{4})_{n}OH

The starting materials are usually primary alcohols as they tend to react 10–30× faster than secondary alcohols do. Typically 5-10 units of ethylene oxide are added to each alcohol, however ethoxylated alcohols can be more prone to ethoxylation than the starting alcohol, making the reaction difficult to control and leading to the formation of a product with varying repeat unit length (the value of n in the equation above). Better control can be afforded by the use of more sophisticated catalysts, which can be used to generate narrow-range ethoxylates. Ethoxylated alcohols are considered to be a high production volume (HPV) chemical by the US EPA.

==== Ethoxylation/propoxylation ====
Ethoxylation is sometimes combined with propoxylation, the analogous reaction using propylene oxide as the monomer. Both reactions are normally performed in the same reactor and may be run simultaneously to give a random polymer, or in alternation to obtain block copolymers such as poloxamers. Propylene oxide is more hydrophobic than ethylene oxide and its inclusion at low levels can significantly affect the properties of the surfactant. In particular ethoxylated fatty alcohols which have been 'capped' with ~1 propylene oxide unit are extensively marketed as defoamers.

==== Ethoxysulfates ====
Ethoxylated fatty alcohols are often converted to the corresponding organosulfates, which can be easily deprotonated to give anionic surfactants such as sodium laureth sulfate. Being salts, ethoxysulfates exhibit good water solubility (high HLB value). The conversion is achieved by treating ethoxylated alcohols with sulfur trioxide. Laboratory scale synthesis may be performed using chlorosulfuric acid:

R(OC_{2}H_{4})_{n} + SO_{3} → R(OC_{2}H_{4})_{n}OSO_{3}H
R(OC_{2}H_{4})_{n} + HSO_{3}Cl → R(OC_{2}H_{4})_{n}OSO_{3}H

The resulting sulfate esters are neutralized to give the salt:

R(OC_{2}H_{4})_{n}OSO_{3}H + NaOH → R(OC_{2}H_{4})_{n}OSO_{3}Na + H_{2}O

Small volumes are neutralized with alkanolamines such as triethanolamine (TEA).

In 2008, 381,000 metric tons of alcohol ethoxysulfates were consumed in North America. Lauryl Alcohol Ethoxylate Analysis with Gas Chromatography (GC)

For the analysis of Lauryl Alcohol Ethoxylate using Gas Chromatography (GC), the selection of a suitable GC column depends on the specific ethoxylation level and the volatility of the compound. In general, Lauryl Alcohol Ethoxylates are non-volatile or semi-volatile, so derivatization might be necessary before GC analysis. Here are some column options for analysis after derivatization (acetylation): 1. Non-polar columns (like DB-1, HP-1, or RTX-1):

These are made of 100% dimethylpolysiloxane. Suitable for analyzing relatively non-polar, derivatized alcohol ethoxylates. Common dimensions: 30 m length, 0.25 mm ID, 0.25 μm film thickness.

2. Mid-polarity columns (like DB-5, HP-5, or RTX-5): These are 5% phenyl, 95% dimethylpolysiloxane. They offer slightly better separation of ethoxylates with varying chain lengths. Common dimensions: 30 m length, 0.25 mm ID, 0.25 μm film thickness.

3. Polar columns (like DB-WAX or HP-FFAP): These are polyethylene glycol (PEG) columns. They are more suited for polar compounds, but Lauryl Alcohol Ethoxylates may still need derivatization. The DB-5 or HP-5 column is often preferred for surfactants like ethoxylates due to its moderate polarity, providing good separation of ethoxylation products.

It's essential to consider the specific range of ethoxylation (number of ethylene oxide units) to optimize the method further. Additionally, derivatization can help in improving volatility and peak shape.

=== Other materials ===
Although alcohols are by far the major substrate for ethoxylation, many nucleophiles are reactive toward ethylene oxide. Primary amines will react to give di-chain materials such as polyethoxylated tallow amine. The reaction of ammonia produces important bulk chemicals such as ethanolamine, diethanolamine, and triethanolamine.

== Applications of ethoxylated products ==
Alcohol ethoxylates (AE) and alcohol ethoxysulfates (AES) are surfactants found in products such as laundry detergents, dishwasher detergents, rinse aids, surface cleaners, cosmetics, agricultural products, textiles, and paint.

=== Alcohol ethoxylates ===
As alcohol ethoxylate based surfactants are non-ionic they typically require longer ethoxylate chains than their sulfonated analogues in order to be water-soluble. Examples synthesized on an industrial scale include octyl phenol ethoxylate, polysorbate 80 and poloxamers. Ethoxylation is commonly practiced, albeit on a much smaller scale, in the biotechnology and pharmaceutical industries to increase water solubility and, in the case of pharmaceuticals, circulatory half-life of non-polar organic compounds. In this application, ethoxylation is known as "PEGylation" (polyethylene oxide is synonymous with polyethylene glycol, abbreviated as PEG). Carbon chain length is 8-18 while the ethoxylated chain is usually 3 to 12 ethylene oxides long in home products. They feature both lipophilic tails, indicated by the alkyl group abbreviation, R, and relatively polar headgroups, represented by the formula R(OC_{2}H_{4})_{n}OH.

=== Alcohol ethoxysulfates ===
AES found in consumer products generally are linear alcohols, which could be mixtures of entirely linear alkyl chains or of both linear and mono-branched alkyl chains. A high-volume example of these is sodium laureth sulfate a foaming agent in shampoos and liquid soaps, as well as industrial detergents.

== Environmental and safety ==
=== Alcohol ethoxylates (AEs) ===
==== Human health ====
Alcohol ethoxylates are not observed to be mutagenic, carcinogenic, or skin sensitizers, nor cause reproductive or developmental effects. One byproduct of ethoxylation is 1,4-dioxane, a possible human carcinogen. Undiluted AEs can cause dermal or eye irritation. In aqueous solution, the level of irritation is dependent on the concentration. AEs are considered to have low to moderate toxicity for acute oral exposure, low acute dermal toxicity, and have mild irritation potential for skin and eyes at concentrations found in consumer products. Recent studies have found dried AE residues similar to what would be found on restaurant dishes (as effective concentrations from 1:10,000 to 1:40,000) killed epithelial intestinal cells at high concentrations. Lower concentrations made cells more permeable and prone to inflammatory response.

==== Aquatic and environmental aspects ====
AEs are usually released down the drain, where they may be adsorbed into solids and biodegrade through anaerobic processes, with ~28–58% degraded in the sewer. The remaining AEs are treated at waste water treatment plants and biodegraded via aerobic processes with less than 0.8% of AEs released in effluent. If released into surface waters, sediment or soil, AEs will degrade through aerobic and anaerobic processes or be taken up by plants and animals.

Toxicity to certain invertebrates has a range of EC50 values for linear AE from 0.1 mg/L to greater than 100 mg/L. For branched alcohol exthoxylates, toxicity ranges from 0.5 mg/L to 50 mg/L. The EC50 toxicity for algae from linear and branched AEs was 0.05 mg/L to 50 mg/L. Acute toxicity to fish ranges from LC50 values for linear AE of 0.4 mg/L to 100 mg/L, and branched is 0.25 mg/L to 40 mg/L. For invertebrates, algae and fish the essentially linear and branched AEs are considered to not have greater toxicity than Linear AE.

=== Alcohol ethoxysulfates (AESs) ===
==== Biodegradation ====
The degradation of AES proceeds by ω- or β-oxidation of the alkyl chain, enzymatic hydrolysis of the sulfate ester, and by cleavage of an ether bond in the AES producing alcohol or alcohol ethoxylate and an ethylene glycol sulfate. Studies of aerobic processes also found AES to be readily biodegradable. The half-life of both AE and AES in surface water is estimated to be less than 12 hours. The removal of AES due to degradation via anaerobic processes is estimated to be between 75 and 87%.

==== In water ====
Flow-through laboratory tests in a terminal pool of AES with mollusks found the NOEC of a snail, Goniobasis and the Asian clam, Corbicula to be greater than 730 ug/L. Corbicula growth was measured to be affected at a concentration of 75 ug/L. The mayfly, genus Tricorythodes has a normalized density NOEC value of 190 ug/L.

==== Human safety ====
AES has not been found to be genotoxic, mutagenic, or carcinogenic. A 2022 study revealed the expression of genes involved in cell survival, epithelial barrier, cytokine signaling, and metabolism were altered by rinse aid in concentrations used in professional dishwashers. The alcohol ethoxylates present in the rinse aid were identified as the culprit component causing the epithelial inflammation and barrier damage.
