= NP-40 =

Names
- Other names Polyethylene glycol nonylphenyl ether; Nonyl phenoxypolyethoxylethanol; Nonoxynol-40

Identifiers
| CAS Number | 26027-38-3 |
| 3D model (JSmol) | Interactive image |
| ChEMBL | ChEMBL194034 |
| ChemSpider | 23159 |
| EC Number | 500-024-6 |
| PubChem CID | 24773 |
| UNII | 4867M0AEJI |
| UN number | 3082 |
| CompTox Dashboard (EPA) | DTXSID9058600 |
- InChI: InChI=1S/C19H32O3/c1-2-3-4-5-6-7-8-9-18-10-12-19(13-11-18)22-17-16-21-15-14-20/h10-13,20H,2-9,14-17H2,1H3 Key: BLXVTZPGEOGTGG-UHFFFAOYSA-N
- SMILES: CCCCCCCCCC1=CC=C(C=C1)OCCOCCO

Properties
| Chemical formula | H(C_{2}H_{4}O)_{n}O(C_{6}H_{4})C_{9}H_{19} |
| Molar mass | Variable |
- Except where otherwise noted, data are given for materials in their standard state (at 25 °C [77 °F], 100 kPa). Infobox references

NP-40 (also known as Tergitol-type NP-40 and nonyl phenoxypolyethoxylethanol) is a commercially available detergent with CAS Registry Number 9016-45-9. NP-40 is an ethoxylated nonylphenol for non-ionic surfactants and can act as emulsifier and demulsifier agent.

NP-40 is often used to break open all membranes within a cell, including the nuclear membrane. To break only the cytoplasmic membrane, other detergents such as digitonin can be used.

NP-40 has applications in paper and textile processing, in paints and coatings, and in agrochemical manufacturing.

Care should be taken to avoid confusing NP-40 with Nonidet P-40 (octyl phenoxypolyethoxylethanol) which is currently out of production. Nonidet P-40 ("Non-Ionic Detergent") was originally manufactured and trademarked by the Shell Chemical Company, but was phased out of production in the early 2000s. Confusingly, biochemical protocols published between the 1960s and 2000s refer to Shell's Nonidet P-40 as NP-40. Shell's original Nonidet P-40 had a hydrophilic-lipophilic balance (HLB) value of 13.5, as opposed to 12.9 for the currently available IGEPAL CA-630, indicating that the currently available compound is more potent than the compound used in older publications. Indeed, according to a 2017 report, an additional dilution factor of 10 was required for the currently available NP-40 ("Nonidet P-40 substitutes") to match the activity of the previously available, and now discontinued, Shell's Nonidet P-40.

== See also ==
- Nonoxynol-9
- Surfactant
- Lipid bilayer
- Detergent
- Triton X-100 (differs only in the # of carbons in the aliphatic portion)
