= Sorbitan monostearate =

Names
- IUPAC name 1,4-Anhydro-D-glucitol 6-octadecanoate
- Systematic IUPAC name (2R)-2-[(2R,3R,4S)-3,4-Dihydroxyoxolan-2-yl]-2-hydroxyethyl octadecanoate

Identifiers
CAS Number	1338-41-6
3D model (JSmol)	Interactive image
ChemSpider	16736467
ECHA InfoCard	100.014.241
E number	E491 (thickeners, ...)
PubChem CID	16218600
UNII	NVZ4I0H58X
CompTox Dashboard (EPA)	DTXSID70872695 DTXSID1027396, DTXSID70872695
- InChI: InChI=1S/C24H46O6/c1-2-3-4-5-6-7-8-9-10-11-12-13-14-15-16-17-22(27)29-19-21(26)24-23(28)20(25)18-30-24/h20-21,23-26,28H,2-19H2,1H3/t20-,21+,23+,24+/m0/s1 Key: HVUMOYIDDBPOLL-XWVZOOPGSA-N; InChI=1/C24H46O6/c1-2-3-4-5-6-7-8-9-10-11-12-13-14-15-16-17-22(27)29-19-21(26)24-23(28)20(25)18-30-24/h20-21,23-26,28H,2-19H2,1H3/t20-,21+,23+,24+/m0/s1 Key: HVUMOYIDDBPOLL-XWVZOOPGBK
- SMILES: O[C@H](COC(=O)CCCCCCCCCCCCCCCCC)[C@H]1OC[C@H](O)[C@H]1O

Properties
Chemical formula	C_{24}H_{46}O_{6}
Molar mass	430.62 g/mol
Appearance	Waxy powder
- Except where otherwise noted, data are given for materials in their standard state (at 25 °C [77 °F], 100 kPa). verify (what is ?) Infobox references

Sorbitan monostearate is an ester of sorbitan (a sorbitol derivative) and stearic acid and is sometimes referred to as a synthetic wax.

== Uses ==
Sorbitan monostearate is used in the manufacture of food and healthcare products as a non-ionic surfactant with emulsifying, dispersing, and wetting properties. It is also employed to create synthetic fibers, metal machining fluid, and as a brightener in the leather industry. Sorbitans are also known as "Spans".

Sorbitan monostearate has been approved by the European Union for use as a food additive (emulsifier) (E number: E 491). It is also approved for use by the British Pharmacopoeia.

== See also ==
- Polysorbate
- Sorbitan tristearate (Span 65)
