= Amino sugar =

Type of sugar molecule

Glucosamine, a common amino sugar.

In organic chemistry, an amino sugar is a sugar molecule in which a hydroxyl group has been replaced with an amine group. More than 60 amino sugars are known, with one of the most abundant being N-acetyl-D-glucosamine (a 2-amino-2-deoxysugar), which is the main component of chitin.

Derivatives of amine containing sugars, such as N-acetylglucosamine and sialic acid, whose nitrogens are part of more complex functional groups rather than formally being amines, are also considered amino sugars. Aminoglycosides are a class of antimicrobial compounds that inhibit bacterial protein synthesis. These compounds are conjugates of amino sugars and aminocyclitols.

== Biosynthesis ==
Streptomycin, an antibiotic, contains two amino sugars.

Amino sugars are formed by introducing amines into the keto forms of sugars. The transformations are catalyzed by aminotransferases and amidotransferases. The amine donors are the amino acids glutamate and glutamine.

== Organic chemistry ==
=== From glycals ===
Glycals are cyclic enol ether derivatives of monosaccharides, having a double bond between carbon atoms 1 and 2 of the ring. N-functionalized of glycals at the C2 position, combined with glycosidic bond formation at C1 is a common strategy for the synthesis of amino sugars. This can be achieved using azides with subsequent reduction yielding the amino sugar. One advantage of introducing azide moiety at C-2 lies in its non-participatory ability, which could serve as the basis of stereoselective synthesis of 1.2-cis-glycosidic linkage.

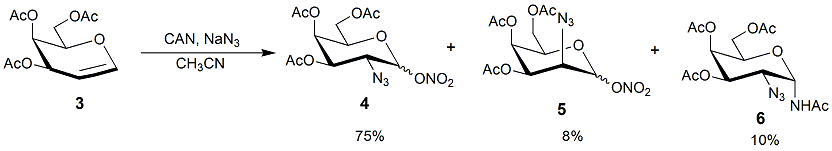

Azides give high regioselectivity, however stereoselectivity both at C-1 and C-2 is generally poor. Usually anomeric mixtures will be obtained and the stereochemistry formed at C-2 is heavily dependent upon the starting substrates. For galactal, addition of azide to the double bond will preferentially occur from equatorial direction because of steric hindrance at the top face caused by axial group at C-4. For glucal, azide could attack from both axial and equatorial directions with almost similar probability, so its selectivity will decrease.

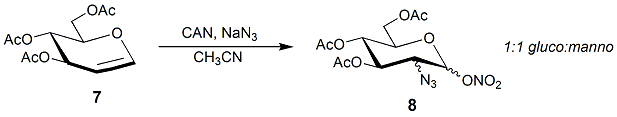

Glycals may also be converted into amino sugars by nitration followed by treatment with thiophenol (Michael addition) to furnish a thioglycoside donor. This is a versatile donor and can react with simple or carbohydrate alcohols to establish the glycosidic linkage, with reduction and N-acetylation of nitro group will give the targeted product.

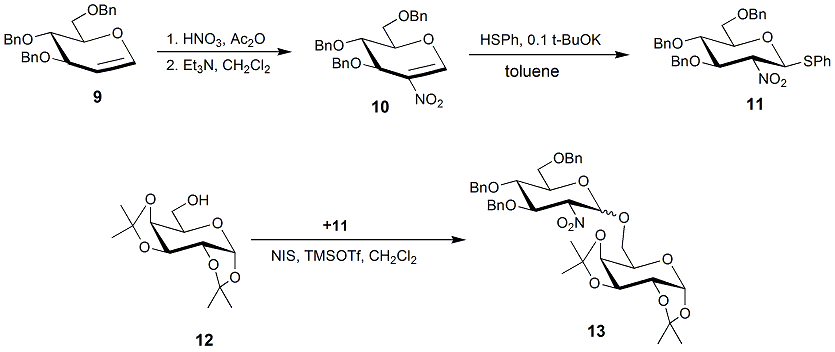

One-pot reactions have also been reported. For instance glycal, activated by thianthrene-5-oxide and Tf_{2}O is treated with an amide nucleophile and a glycosyl acceptor to produce various 1,2-trans C-2-amidoglycosides. Both the C-2 nitrogen introduction and the glycosidic bond formation precede stereoselectively. This methodology makes the introduction of both natural and non-natural amide functionalities at C-2 possible and more importantly with glycosidic bond formation at the same time in a one-pot procedure.

=== Via nucleophilic displacement ===
Nucleophilic displacement can be an effective strategy for the synthesis of amino sugars, however success strongly depends upon the nature of nucleophile, the type of leaving group and site of displacements on sugar rings. One aspect of this problem is that displacements at the C2 position tend to be slow as it is adjacent to the anomeric centre; this is particularly true for glycosides with axially-oriented aglycones.

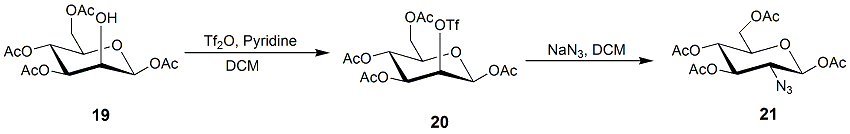

Epoxides are suitable starting materials for realizing nucleophilic displacement reaction to introduce azide into C-2. Anhydrosugar 21 could be transformed into thioglycoside 22, which serves as a donor to react with alcohols to obtain 2-azide-2-deoxy-O-glycosides. The subsequent reduction and N-acetylation will furnish the desired 2-N-acetamido-2-deoxyglycosides.

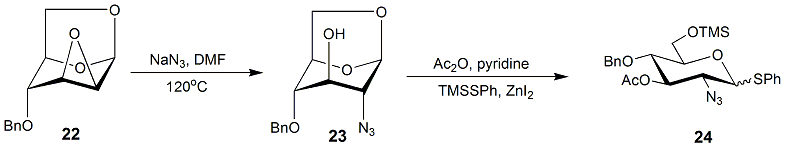

== See also ==
- Iminosugar
- N-Acetylglucosamine
- Galactosamine
- Glucosamine
- Sialic acid
- L-Daunosamine
- 1β-Methylseleno-N-acetyl-D-galactosamine
- Trehalosamine
