= Sorbitan tristearate =

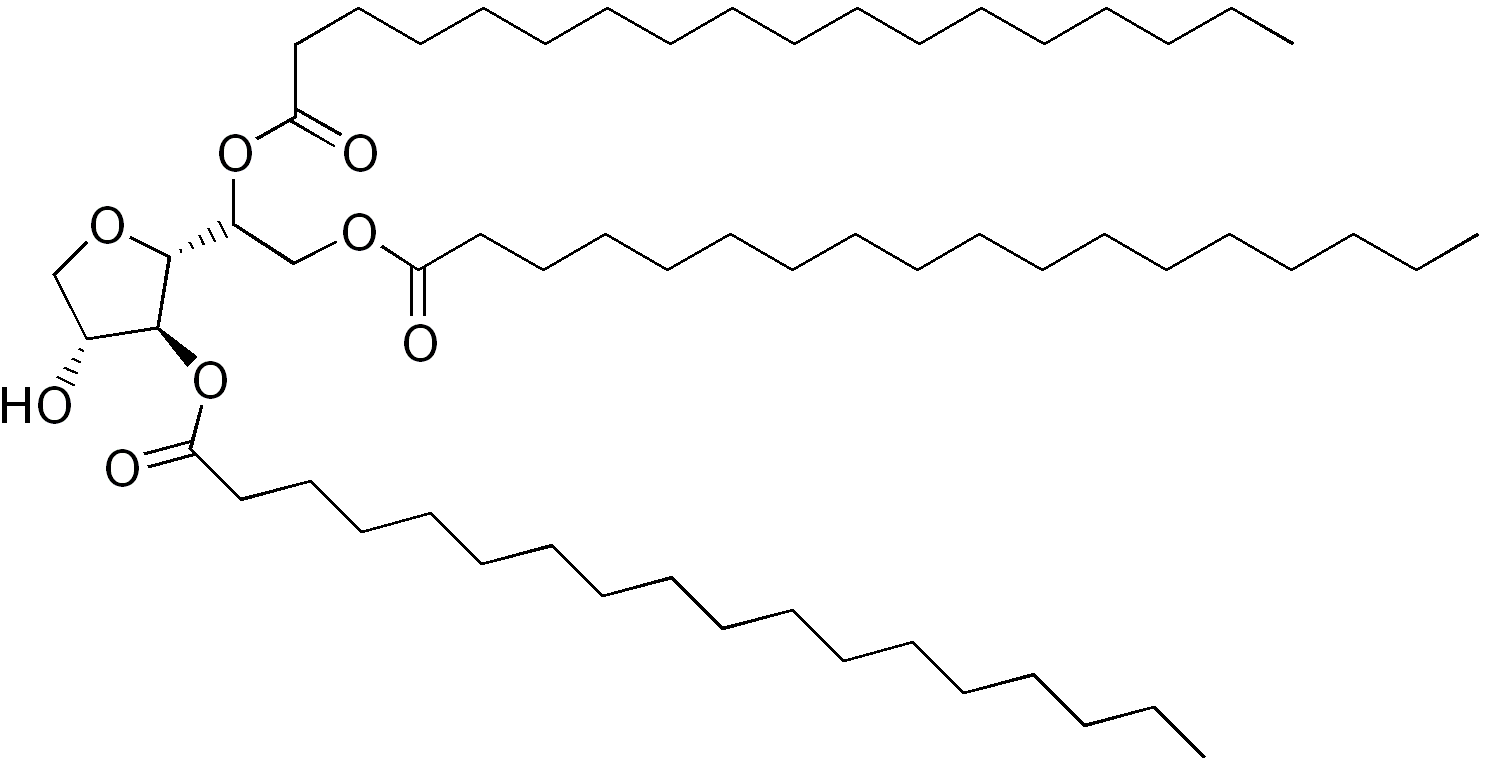

Names
- IUPAC name Octadecanoic acid [(2R,3S,4R)-2-[1,2-bis(1-oxooctadecoxy)ethyl]-4-hydroxy-3-tetrahydrofuranyl] ester
- Other names: Sorbitan trioctadecanoate; E492; Anhydrosorbitan tristearate; Anhydrosorbitol tristearate; Span 65

Identifiers
CAS Number	26658-19-5
3D model (JSmol)	Interactive image
ChemSpider	56549
ECHA InfoCard	100.043.523
EC Number	247-891-4
E number	E492 (thickeners, ...)
PubChem CID	62815
UNII	6LUM696811
CompTox Dashboard (EPA)	DTXSID8047054
- InChI: Key: IJCWFDPJFXGQBN-BIFNRIDTSA-N; InChI=1/C60H114O8/c1-4-7-10-13-16-19-22-25-28-31-34-37-40-43-46-49-56(62)65-53-55(67-57(63)50-47-44-41-38-35-32-29-26-23-20-17-14-11-8-5-2)60-59(54(61)52-66-60)68-58(64)51-48-45-42-39-36-33-30-27-24-21-18-15-12-9-6-3/h54-55,59-61H,4-53H2,1-3H3/t54-,55?,59+,60-/m1/s1
- SMILES: CCCCCCCCCCCCCCCCCC(=O)OCC([C@@H]1[C@H]([C@@H](CO1)O)OC(=O)CCCCCCCCCCCCCCCCC)OC(=O)CCCCCCCCCCCCCCCCC

Properties
Chemical formula	C_{60}H_{114}O_{8}
Molar mass	963.54 g/mol
Appearance	Waxy solid
- Except where otherwise noted, data are given for materials in their standard state (at 25 °C [77 °F], 100 kPa). verify (what is ?) Infobox references

Sorbitan tristearate is a nonionic surfactant. It is variously used as a dispersing agent, emulsifier, and stabilizer, in food and in aerosol sprays. As a food additive, it has the E number E492. Brand names for polysorbates include Alkest, Canarcel, and Span. The consistency of sorbitan tristearate is waxy; its color is light cream to tan.

== See also ==
- Sorbitan monostearate (Span 60)
