= Glucal =

Names
- IUPAC name 1,5-Anhydro-2-deoxy-D-arabino-hex-1-enitol
- Systematic IUPAC name (2R,3S,4R)-2-(Hydroxymethyl)-3,4-dihydro-2H-pyran-3,4-diol

Identifiers
CAS Number	13265-84-4
3D model (JSmol)	Interactive image
ChEMBL	ChEMBL2115567
ChemSpider	2016480
ECHA InfoCard	100.032.949
EC Number	236-259-3
PubChem CID	2734736
CompTox Dashboard (EPA)	DTXSID60157685
- InChI: InChI=1S/C6H10O4/c7-3-5-6(9)4(8)1-2-10-5/h1-2,4-9H,3H2/t4-,5-,6+/m1/s1 Key: YVECGMZCTULTIS-PBXRRBTRSA-N; InChI=1/C6H10O4/c7-3-5-6(9)4(8)1-2-10-5/h1-2,4-9H,3H2/t4-,5-,6+/m1/s1 Key: YVECGMZCTULTIS-PBXRRBTRBT
- SMILES: C1=CO[C@@H]([C@H]([C@@H]1O)O)CO

Properties
Chemical formula	C_{6}H_{10}O_{4}
Molar mass	146.1412
Melting point	58 to 60 °C (136 to 140 °F; 331 to 333 K)

Hazards
- GHS labelling
Pictograms	(GHS07: Exclamation mark)
Signal word	Warning
Hazard statements	H315, H319, H335
Precautionary statements	P261, P264, P271, P280, P302+P352, P304+P340, P305+P351+P338, P312, P321, P332+P313, P337+P313, P362, P403+P233, P405, P501
- Except where otherwise noted, data are given for materials in their standard state (at 25 °C [77 °F], 100 kPa). verify (what is ?) Infobox references

Glucal is the glycal formed from glucose. It is a chemical intermediate in the synthesis of a variety of oligosaccharides.

Glucal and its derivatives can be converted to other chemically useful sugars using the Ferrier rearrangement.
