= Nonidet P-40 =

Detergent

Nonidet P-40 is a nonionic, non-denaturing detergent. Its official IUPAC name is octylphenoxypolyethoxyethanol.

Nonidet P-40 is sometimes abbreviated as NP-40, but should not be confused with a different detergent by the same name NP-40, nonylphenoxypolyethoxyethanol of the Tergitol NP series of Dow Chemicals.

Nonidet was a trademark of Shell Chemical Co. from 1956 to the early 2000s, but they no longer make it.

Nonidet P-40 is no longer sold by the chemical company Sigma-Aldrich. Sigma-Aldrich has replaced Nonidet P-40 with IGEPAL CA-630, which is described as a "nonionic, non-denaturing detergent". Sigma-Aldrich claims that IGEPAL CA-630 is "chemically indistinguishable from Nonidet P-40".

IGEPAL consists of octyl-phenoxy(polyoxyethylene)ethanol. Tergitol and the Sigma and BioChemica Nonidet P40 substitute detergents consist of nonyl-phenyl-polyethylene glycol. The original Shell Nonidet P-40 consisted of octyl-phenoxy(polyoxyethylene)ethanol, making IGEPAL the most comparable of the four substitutes.
