= Triton X-100 =

Names
- IUPAC name 2-[4-(2,4,4-trimethylpentan-2-yl)phenoxy]ethanol
- Other names: Polyethylene glycol p-(1,1,3,3-tetramethylbutyl)-phenyl ether; Octyl phenol ethoxylate; Polyoxyethylene octyl phenyl ether; 4-Octylphenol polyethoxylate; Mono 30; TX-100; t-Octylphenoxypolyethoxyethanol; Octoxynol-9; octoxinol

Identifiers
CAS Number	9002-93-1; 100.9: 2315-65-3; 100-10: 2315-66-4
3D model (JSmol)	100.9: Interactive image; 100-10: Interactive image; 1: Interactive image
ChEMBL	100-10: ChEMBL1235043
ChemSpider	100.9: 400272; 100-10: 400273
ECHA InfoCard	100.123.919
PubChem CID	100.9: 454540; 100-10: 454541; 1: 5590
UNII	3E2NC94VPF
CompTox Dashboard (EPA)	DTXSID8034085; 100.9: DTXSID601018400; 100-10: DTXSID20920397
- InChI: 100.9: InChI=1S/C32H58O10/c1-31(2,3)28-32(4,5)29-6-8-30(9-7-29)42-27-26-41-25-24-40-23-22-39-21-20-38-19-18-37-17-16-36-15-14-35-13-12-34-11-10-33/h6-9,33H,10-28H2,1-5H3 Key: VJYAJQFKKLYARJ-UHFFFAOYSA-N; 100-10: InChI=1S/C34H62O11/c1-33(2,3)30-34(4,5)31-6-8-32(9-7-31)45-29-28-44-27-26-43-25-24-42-23-22-41-21-20-40-19-18-39-17-16-38-15-14-37-13-12-36-11-10-35/h6-9,35H,10-30H2,1-5H3 Key: IVKNZCBNXPYYKL-UHFFFAOYSA-N; 1: InChI=1S/C16H26O2/c1-15(2,3)12-16(4,5)13-6-8-14(9-7-13)18-11-10-17/h6-9,17H,10-12H2,1-5H3 Key: JYCQQPHGFMYQCF-UHFFFAOYSA-N
- SMILES: 100.9: CC(C)(C)CC(C)(C)C1=CC=C(C=C1)OCCOCCOCCOCCOCCOCCOCCOCCOCCO; 100-10: CC(C)(C)CC(C)(C)C1=CC=C(C=C1)OCCOCCOCCOCCOCCOCCOCCOCCOCCOCCO; 1: CC(C)(C)CC(C)(C)C1=CC=C(C=C1)OCCO

Properties
Chemical formula	C_{14}H_{22}O(C_{2}H_{4}O)_{n} (n = 9-10)
Molar mass	647 g mol^{−1}
Appearance	viscous colourless liquid
Density	1.07 g/cm^{3}
Melting point	6 °C (43 °F; 279 K)
Boiling point	270 °C (518 °F; 543 K)
Solubility in water	Soluble
- Surface tension
CMC	0.22 mM
Vapor pressure	< 1 mmHg (130 Pa) at 20 °C
Refractive index (n_{D})	1.490-1.494

Hazards
Flash point	251 °C (484 °F; 524 K)
Safety data sheet (SDS)	MSDS
- Except where otherwise noted, data are given for materials in their standard state (at 25 °C [77 °F], 100 kPa). verify (what is ?) Infobox references

Triton X-100 (C_{14}H_{22}O(C_{2}H_{4}O)_{n}) is a nonionic surfactant that has a hydrophilic polyethylene oxide chain (on average it has 9.5 ethylene oxide units) and an aromatic hydrocarbon lipophilic or hydrophobic group. The hydrocarbon group is a 4-(1,1,3,3-tetramethylbutyl)-phenyl group. Triton X-100 is closely related to IGEPAL CA-630, which might differ from it mainly in having slightly shorter ethylene oxide chains. As a result, Triton X-100 is slightly more hydrophilic than Igepal CA-630 thus these two detergents may not be considered functionally interchangeable for most applications.

Triton X-100 was originally a registered trademark of Rohm and Haas Co. It was subsequently purchased by Union Carbide and then acquired by Dow Chemical Company upon the acquisition of Union Carbide. Soon afterward (in 2009), Dow also acquired Rohm & Haas Co.

== Physical properties ==
Undiluted Triton X-100 is a clear viscous fluid (less viscous than undiluted glycerol). Undiluted Triton X-100 has a viscosity of about 270 centipoise at 25 °C which comes down to about 80 centipoise at 50 °C. Triton X-100 is soluble at 25 °C in water, toluene, xylene, trichloroethylene, ethylene glycol, diethyl ether, ethanol, isopropyl alcohol, and 1,2-dichloroethane. Triton X-100 is insoluble in kerosene, mineral spirits, and naphtha, unless a coupling agent like oleic acid is used.

== Uses ==
Triton X-100 is a commonly used detergent in laboratories. Triton X-100 is widely used to lyse cells to extract protein or organelles, or to permeabilize the membranes of living cells. Lipid bilayers, especially those rich in sphingolipids and cholesterol, are insoluble in this surfactant.

Some applications include:

- Inactivation of lipid-enveloped viruses (e.g. HIV, HBV, HCV) in manufacturing of biopharmaceuticals
- Industrial purpose (plating of metal)
- Ingredient in influenza vaccines, including Fluarix, Flublok, and Fluzone
- Permeabilizing unfixed (or lightly fixed) eukaryotic cell membranes
- Solubilizing membrane proteins in their native state in conjunction with zwitterionic detergents such as CHAPS
- Part of the lysis buffer (usually in a 5% solution in alkaline lysis buffer) in DNA extraction
- Reducing surface tension of aqueous solutions during immunostaining (usually at a concentration of 0.1-0.5% in TBS or PBS buffer)
- Dispersion of carbon materials for soft composite materials
- Restricting colony expansion in Aspergillus nidulans in microbiology
- Decellularization of animal-derived tissues
- Removing SDS from SDS-PAGE gels prior to renaturing the proteins within the gel
- Disruption of cell monolayers as a positive control for TEER measurements
- Micellar catalyst
- Reducing surface tension in etching such as undercutting fine features (micron size openings) in MEMS device processing
- it is an ingredient in Photo-Flo, a solution used in photographic processing to prevent minerals from water being deposited on the film after drying.

Apart from laboratory use, Triton X-100 can be found in several cleaning compounds, ranging from heavy-duty industrial products to gentle detergents. It is also a popular ingredient in homemade vinyl record cleaning fluids together with distilled water and isopropyl alcohol.

== Regulation in the European Union ==
In December 2012, the European Chemicals Agency (ECHA) included the substance group "4-(1,1,3,3-tetramethylbutyl)phenol, ethoxylated" – which includes Triton X-100 – in the Candidate List of substances of very high concern of the Registration, Evaluation, Authorisation and Restriction of Chemicals (REACH) Regulation which addresses the production, import and use of chemical substances and their potential impacts on human health and the environment. A Triton X-100 degradation product has indeed turned out to be ecotoxic as it possesses hormone-like (estrogeno-mimetic) activity that may act on wildlife. The ECHA finally included the substance group in the Authorisation List (Annex XIV), mandating the pharmaceutical and other industries to replace this detergent by the "sunset date" January 4, 2021, thereby affecting EU manufacturers, importers, and downstream users, as well as non-European manufacturers exporting their products into the EU.

=== Alternatives for viral inactivation ===
Since the inclusion of Triton X-100 in the candidate list of substances of very high concern for authorization, pharmaceutical companies, as well as bioprocessing research groups, are in need of an alternative detergent which must at the same time be eco-friendly and effective. Ideally, a Triton X-100 replacement should generate minimal manufacturing process change, because only then the necessary updates of regulatory filings for medicines could be realized without additional animal experiments or even clinical studies. Therefore, an alternative virus-inactivating detergent should have physico-chemical properties similar to Triton X-100, be soluble, easy to remove, and eco-friendly, and not degrade to toxic metabolites. In a recent study, two alternatives for antiviral treatment in biopharmaceutical manufacturing have been identified: Triton X-100 reduced, as well as a novel compound which was named Nereid (after the mermaids in Greek mythology). As reflected by the name, Nereid can be seen as just another relative of the Triton X-100 family, however, due to a small molecular difference, it does not degrade into phenolic compounds the way that Triton X-100 does. The virus inactivation studies comprised experiments with several relevant viruses under various conditions. It turned out that at room temperature, where most virus inactivation steps in biopharmaceutical manufacturing are conducted, both Triton X-100 reduced and Nereid showed very similar virus inactivating performances as Triton X-100. In contrast, for some processes that are conducted at cold temperatures, Nereid and Triton X-100 gave better results than Triton X-100 reduced.
