= Hydrophilic-lipophilic balance =

Measure of degree to which a surface active agents is hydrophilic or lipophilic

HLB scale showing classification of surfactant function

The hydrophilic–lipophilic balance (HLB) of a surfactant is a measure of its degree of hydrophilicity or lipophilicity, determined by calculating percentages of molecular weights for the hydrophilic and lipophilic portions of the surfactant molecule, as described by Griffin in 1949 and 1954. Other methods have been suggested, notably in 1957 by Davies.

== Griffin's method ==
Griffin's method for non-ionic surfactants as described in 1954 works as follows:

$$\mathrm{HLB} = 20 \times M_h / M$$

where $M_h$ is the molecular mass of the hydrophilic portion of the molecule, and M is the molecular mass of the whole molecule, giving a result on a scale of 0 to 20. An HLB value of 0 corresponds to a completely lipophilic/hydrophobic molecule, and a value of 20 corresponds to a completely hydrophilic/lipophobic molecule.

The HLB value can be used to predict the surfactant properties of a molecule:

- < 10 : Lipid-soluble (water-insoluble)
- > 10 : Water-soluble (lipid-insoluble)
- 1 to 3: anti-foaming agent
- 3 to 6: W/O (water in oil) emulsifier
- 7 to 9: wetting and spreading agent
- 13 to 16: detergent
- 8 to 16: O/W (oil in water) emulsifier
- 16 to 18: solubiliser or hydrotrope

== Davies' method ==
In 1957, Davies suggested a method based on calculating a value based on the chemical groups of the molecule. The advantage of this method is that it takes into account the effect of stronger and weaker hydrophilic groups. The method works as follows:

$$\mathrm{HLB} = 7 + \sum_{i \mathop{=} 1}^{m}{H_i} - 0.475 \times n$$

where:

$m$
Number of hydrophilic groups in the molecule

$H_i$
Value of the $i$^{th} hydrophilic groups (see tables)

$n$
Number of lipophilic groups in the molecule

Hydrophilic Groups	Group Number
−SO^{−}_{4}Na^{+}	38.6
−COO^{−}K^{+}	21.1
−COO^{−}Na^{+}	19.1
N (tertiary amine)	9.4
Ester (sorbitan ring)	6.8
Ester (free)	2.4
−COOH	2.1
Hydroxyl (free)	1.9
−O−	1.3
Hydroxyl (sorbitan ring)	0.5

Lipophilic Groups	Group Number
−CH−	−0.475
−CH_{2}−	−0.475
CH_{3}−	−0.475
=CH−	−0.475
