= Steric effects =

Geometric aspects of ions and molecules affecting their shape and reactivity

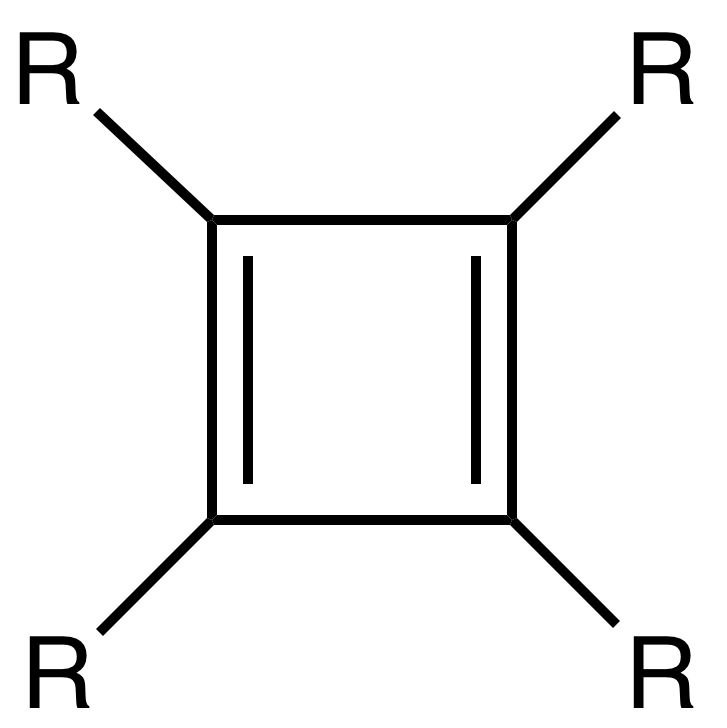
The parent cyclobutadiene (R = H) readily dimerizes but the R = tert-butyl derivative is robust.

Steric effects arise from the spatial arrangement of atoms. When atoms come close together there is generally a rise in the energy of the molecule. Steric effects are nonbonding interactions that influence the shape (conformation) and reactivity of ions and molecules. Steric effects complement electronic effects, which dictate the shape and reactivity of molecules. Steric repulsive forces between overlapping electron clouds result in structured groupings of molecules stabilized by the way that unlike charges attract and like charges repel.

== Steric hindrance ==
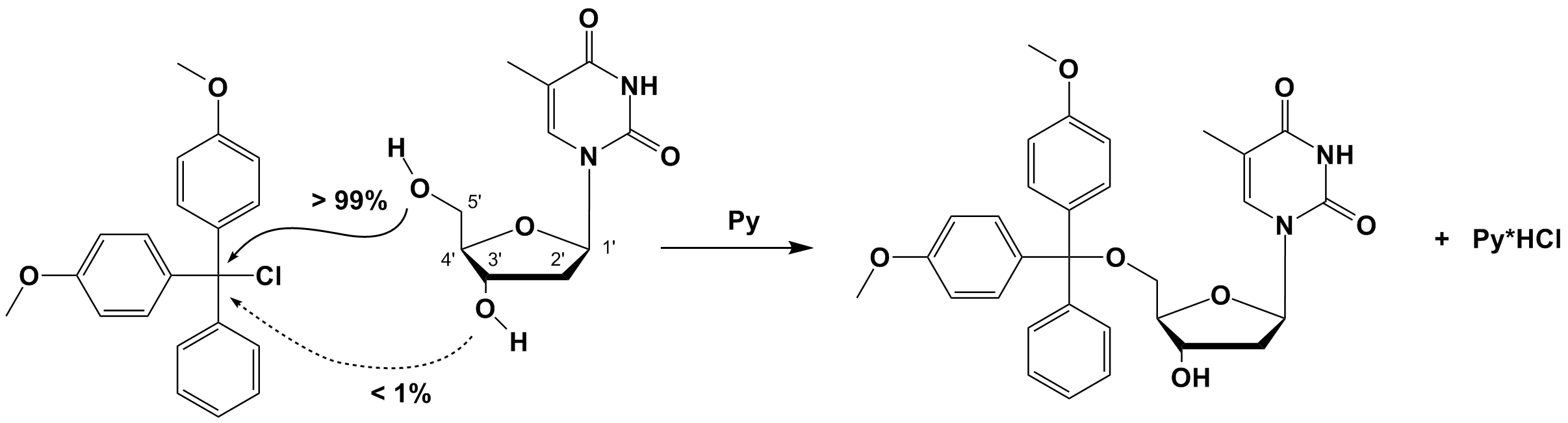
Regioselective dimethoxytritylation of the primary 5'-hydroxyl group of thymidine in the presence of a free secondary 3'-hydroxy group as a result of steric hindrance due to the dimethoxytrityl group and the ribose ring (Py = pyridine).

Steric hindrance is a consequence of steric effects. Steric hindrance is the slowing of chemical reactions due to steric bulk. It is usually manifested in intermolecular reactions, whereas discussion of steric effects often focus on intramolecular interactions. Steric hindrance is often exploited to control selectivity, such as slowing unwanted side-reactions.

Steric hindrance between adjacent groups can also affect torsional bond angles. Steric hindrance is responsible for the observed shape of rotaxanes and the low rates of racemization of 2,2'-disubstituted biphenyl and binaphthyl derivatives.

== Measures of steric properties ==
Because steric effects have profound impact on properties, the steric properties of substituents have been assessed by numerous methods.

=== Rate data ===
Relative rates of chemical reactions provide useful insights into the effects of the steric bulk of substituents. Under standard conditions, methyl bromide solvolyzes 10^{7} faster than does neopentyl bromide. The difference reflects the inhibition of attack on the compound with the sterically bulky (CH_{3})_{3}C group.

=== A-values ===
A-values provide another measure of the bulk of substituents. A-values are derived from equilibrium measurements of monosubstituted cyclohexanes. The extent that a substituent favors the equatorial position gives a measure of its bulk.

The A-value for a methyl group is 1.74 as derived from the chemical equilibrium above. It costs 1.74 kcal/mol for the methyl group to adopt to the axial position compared to the equatorial position.

Substituent	A-value
H	0
CH_{3}	1.74
CH_{2}CH_{3}	1.75
CH(CH_{3})_{2}	2.15
C(CH_{3})_{3}	>4

=== Ceiling temperatures ===
Ceiling temperature ($T_c$) is a measure of the steric properties of the monomers that comprise a polymer. $T_c$ is the temperature where the rate of polymerization and depolymerization are equal. Sterically hindered monomers give polymers with low $T_c$'s, which are usually not useful.

Monomer	Ceiling temperature (°C)	Structure
ethylene	610	CH_{2}=CH_{2}
isobutylene	175	CH_{2}=CMe_{2}
1,3-butadiene	585	CH_{2}=CHCH=CH_{2}
isoprene	466	CH_{2}=C(Me)CH=CH_{2}
styrene	395	PhCH=CH_{2}
α-methylstyrene	66	PhC(Me)=CH_{2}

=== Cone angles ===
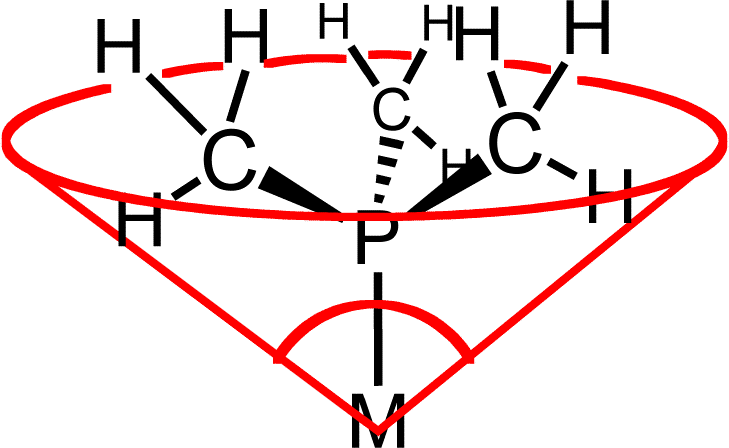
Ligand cone angle

Ligand cone angles are measures of the size of ligands in coordination chemistry. It is defined as the solid angle formed with the metal at the vertex and the hydrogen atoms at the perimeter of the cone (see figure).

Cone angles of common phosphine ligands
Ligand	Angle (°)
PH_{3}	87
P(OCH_{3})_{3}	107
P(CH_{3})_{3}	118
P(CH_{2}CH_{3})_{3}	132
P(C_{6}H_{5})_{3}	145
P(cyclo-C_{6}H_{11})_{3}	179
P(t-Bu)_{3}	182
P(2,4,6-Me_{3}C_{6}H_{2})_{3}	212

== Significance and applications ==
Steric effects are critical to chemistry, biochemistry, and pharmacology. In organic chemistry, steric effects are nearly universal and affect the rates and activation energies of most chemical reactions to varying degrees. In some cases, steric effects are necessary to ensure a molecule's stability. In Günther Maier's corset effect, bulky substituents stabilize a molecular core because decomposition would force the substituents closer together. Conversely, substituent attraction can stabilize molecules; these molecules are called "dispersion-stabilized".

In biochemistry, steric effects are often exploited in naturally occurring molecules such as enzymes, where the catalytic site may be buried within a large protein structure. In pharmacology, steric effects determine how and at what rate a drug will interact with its target bio-molecules.

Prominent sterically hindered compounds

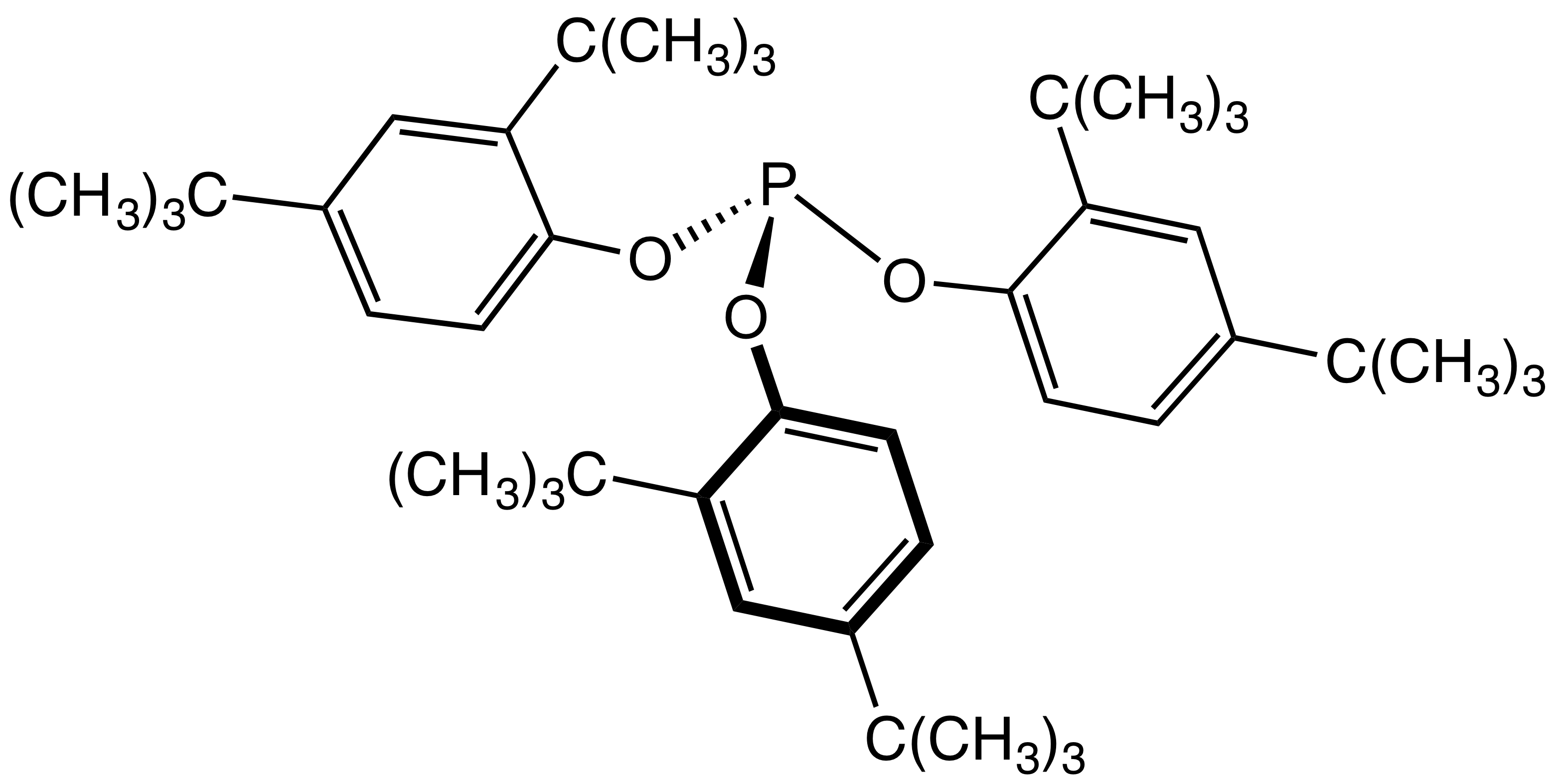
Tris(2,4-di-tert-butylphenyl)phosphite, a widely used stabilizer in polymers.

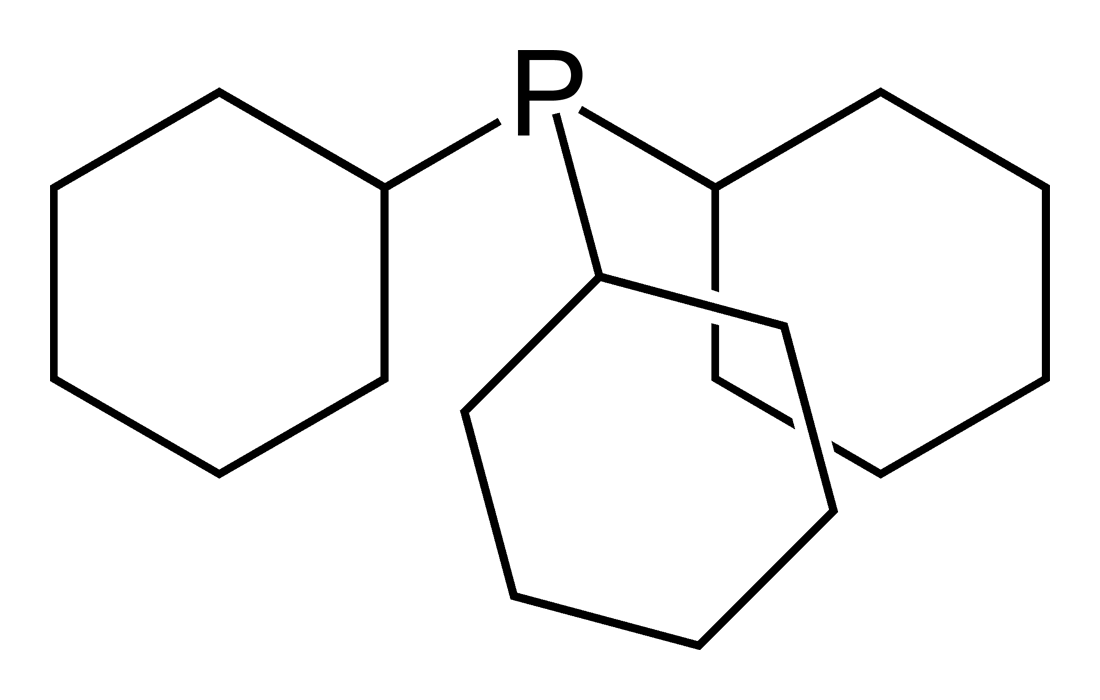
Tricyclohexylphosphine, a bulky phosphine ligand used in homogeneous catalysis and, with B(C_{6}F_{5})_{3}, comprises the classic frustrated Lewis pair.

2,6-Di-tert-butylphenol is used industrially as UV stabilizers and antioxidants for hydrocarbon-based products ranging from petrochemicals to plastics.

Hindered amine light stabilizers are widely used in polymers.

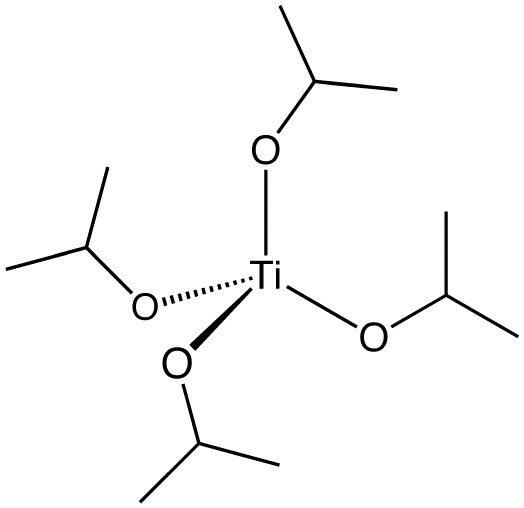
Titanium isopropoxide is a monomer, the corresponding titanium ethoxide is a tetramer.

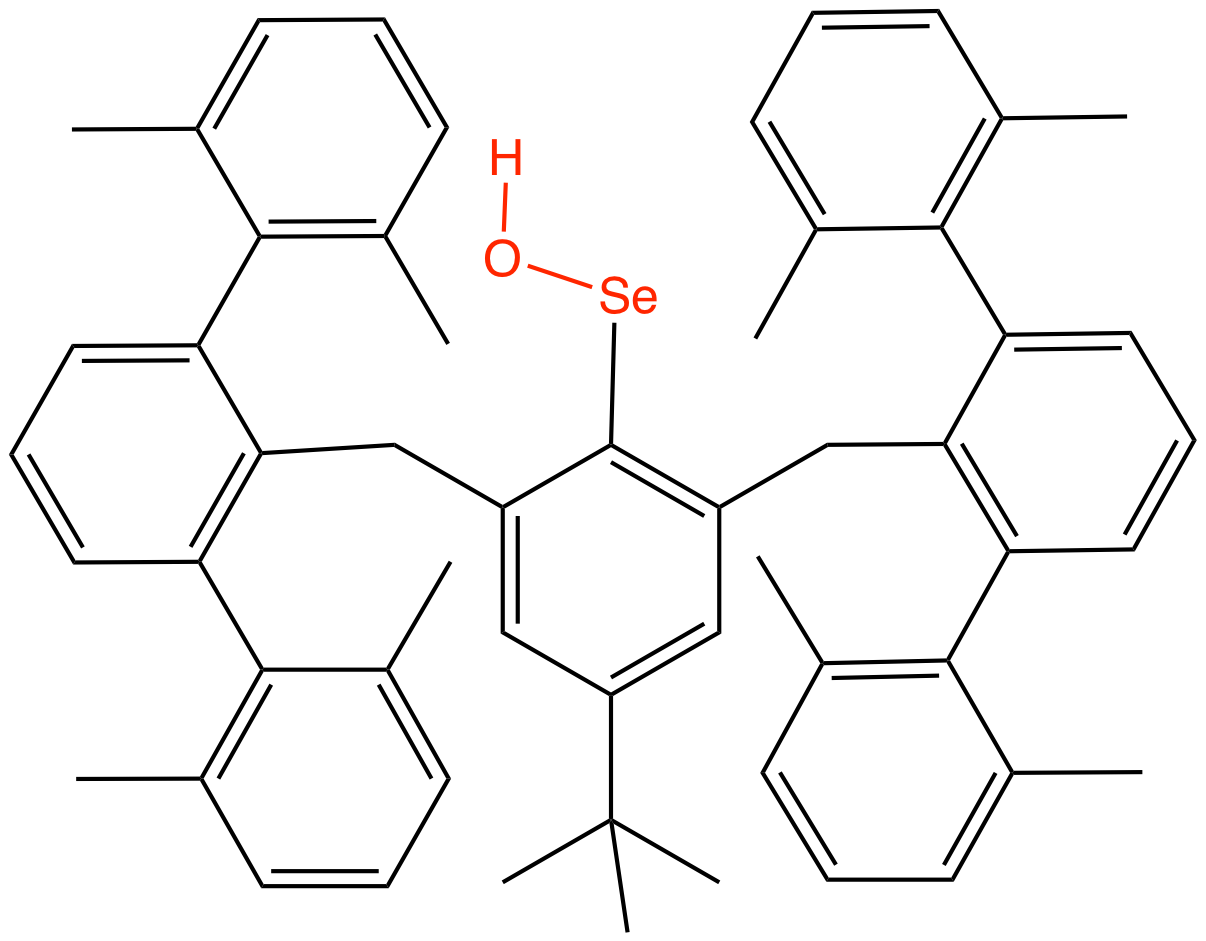
An isolable selenenic acid owing to steric protection.

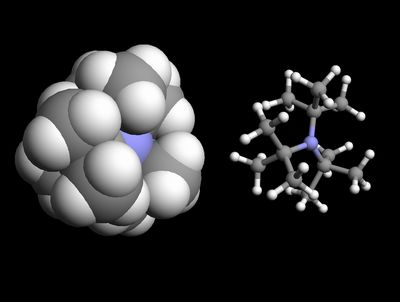
The steric effect of tri-(tert-butyl)amine makes electrophilic reactions, like forming the tetraalkylammonium cation, difficult. It is difficult for electrophiles to get close enough to allow attack by the lone pair of the nitrogen (nitrogen is shown in blue)

== See also ==
- Collision theory
- Intramolecular force
- Sterically induced reduction
- Reaction rate accelerate as result of steric hindrance in the Thorpe–Ingold effect
- Van der Waals strain, also known as steric strain
