= Frustrated Lewis pair =

Chemical catalyst

A frustrated Lewis pair (FLP) is a compound or mixture containing a Lewis acid and a Lewis base that, because of steric hindrance, cannot combine to form a classical adduct. Many kinds of FLPs have been devised, and many simple substrates exhibit activation.

The discovery that some FLPs split H_{2} triggered a rapid growth of research into FLPs. Because of their "unquenched" reactivity, such systems are reactive toward substrates that can undergo heterolysis. For example, many FLPs split hydrogen molecules. Thus, a mixture of tricyclohexylphosphine (PCy_{3}) and tris(pentafluorophenyl)borane reacts with hydrogen to give the respective phosphonium and borate ions:

PCy_{3} + B(C_{6}F_{5})_{3} + H_{2} → [HPCy_{3}]^{+} [HB(C_{6}F_{5})_{3}]^{−}

This reactivity has been exploited to produce FLPs which catalyse hydrogenation reactions.

== Small molecule activation ==
Frustrated Lewis pairs have been shown to activate many small molecules, either by inducing heterolysis or by coordination.

=== Hydrogen ===
The discovery that some FLPs are able to split, and therefore activate, H_{2} triggered a rapid growth of research into this area. The activation and therefore use of H_{2} is important for many chemical and biological transformations. Using FLPs to liberate H_{2} is metal-free, this is beneficial due to the cost and limited supply of some transition metals commonly used to activate H_{2} (Ni, Pd, Pt). FLP systems are reactive toward substrates that can undergo heterolysis (e.g. hydrogen) due to the "unquenched" reactivity of such systems. For example, it has been previously shown that a mixture of tricyclohexylphosphine (PCy_{3}) and tris(pentafluorophenyl)borane reacts with H_{2} to give the respective phosphonium and borate ions:

PCy_{3} + B(C_{6}F_{5})_{3} + H_{2} → [HPCy_{3}]^{+} [HB(C_{6}F_{5})_{3}]^{−}

In this reaction, PCy_{3} (the Lewis base) and B(C_{6}F_{5})_{3} (the Lewis acid) cannot form an adduct due to the steric hindrance from the bulky cyclohexyl and pentafluorophenyl groups. The proton on the phosphorus and hydride from the borate are now 'activated' and can subsequently be 'delivered' to an organic substrate, resulting in hydrogenation.

=== Mechanism of dihydrogen activation by FLP ===
The mechanism for the activation of H_{2} by FLPs has been discussed for both the intermolecular and intramolecular cases. Intermolecular FLPs are where the Lewis base is a separate molecule to the Lewis acid, it is thought that these individual molecules interact through secondary London dispersion interactions to bring the Lewis base and acid together (a pre-organisational effect) where small molecules may then interact with the FLPs. The experimental evidence for this type of interaction at the molecular level is unclear. However, there is supporting evidence for this type of interaction based on computational density functional theory studies. Intramolecular FLPs are where the Lewis acid and Lewis base are combined in one molecule by a covalent linker. Despite the improved 'pre-organisational effects', rigid intramolecular FLP frameworks are thought to have a reduced reactivity to small molecules due to a reduction in flexibility.

=== Other small molecule substrates ===
FLPs are also reactive toward many unsaturated substrates beyond H_{2}. Some FLPs react with CO_{2}, specifically in the deoxygenative reduction of CO_{2} to methane.

Ethene also reacts with FLPs:

PCy_{3} + B(C_{6}F_{5})_{3} + C_{2}H_{4} → Cy_{3}P^{+}CH_{2}CH_{2}B^{−}(C_{6}F_{5})_{3}

For acid-base pairs to behave both nucleophilically and electrophilically at the same time offers a method for the ring-opening of cyclic ethers such as THF, 2,5-dihydrofuran, coumaran, and dioxane.

== Use in catalysis ==
=== Imine, nitrile and aziridine hydrogenation ===
Catalytic cycle for reduction of imine to an amine using an FLP

Reduction of imines, nitriles, and aziridines to primary and secondary amines traditionally is effected by metal hydride reagents, e.g. lithium aluminium hydride and sodium cyanoborohydride. Hydrogenations of these unsaturated substrates can be effected by metal-catalyzed reactions. Metal-free catalytic hydrogenation was carried out using the phosphonium borate catalyst (R_{2}PH)(C_{6}F_{4})BH(C_{6}F_{5})_{2} (R = 2,4,6-Me_{3}C_{6}H_{2}) 1. This type of metal-free hydrogenation has the potential to replace high cost metal catalyst.

The mechanism of imine reduction is proposed to involve protonation at nitrogen giving the iminium salt. The basicity of the nitrogen centre determines the rate of reaction. More electron rich imines reduce at faster rates than electron poor imines. The resulting iminium center undergoes nucleophilic attack by the borohydride anion to form the amine. Small amines bind to the borane, quenching further reactions. This problem can be overcome using various methods: 1) Application of elevated temperatures 2) Using sterically bulky imine substituents 3) Protecting the imine with the B(C_{6}F_{5})_{3}group, which also serves as a Lewis acid promoter.

=== Enantioselective imine hydrogenation ===
A chiral boronate Lewis acid derived from (1R)-(+)-camphor forms a frustrated Lewis pair with ^{t}Bu_{3}P, which is isolable as a salt. This FLP catalyses the enantioselective hydrogenation of some aryl imines in high yield but modest ee (up to 83%).

Asymmetric imine hydrogenation by an FLP

Although conceptually interesting, the protocol suffers from lack of generality. It was found that increasing steric bulk of the imine substituents lead to decreased yield and ee of the amine product. methoxy-substituted imines exhibit superior yield and ee's.

=== Asymmetric hydrosilylations ===
Frustrated Lewis pairs of chiral alkenylboranes and phosphines are beneficial for asymmetric Piers-type hydrosilylations of 1,2-dicarbonyl compounds and alpha-keto esters, giving high yield and enantioselectivity. However, in comparison to conventional Piers-type hydrosilylations, asymmetric Piers-type hydrosilylations are not as well developed.

In the following example, the chiral alkenylborane is formed in situ from a chiral diyne and the HB(C_{6}F_{5})_{2}. Heterolytic cleavage of the Si-H bond from PhMe_{2}SiH by the FLP catalyst forms a silylium and hydridoborate ionic complex.

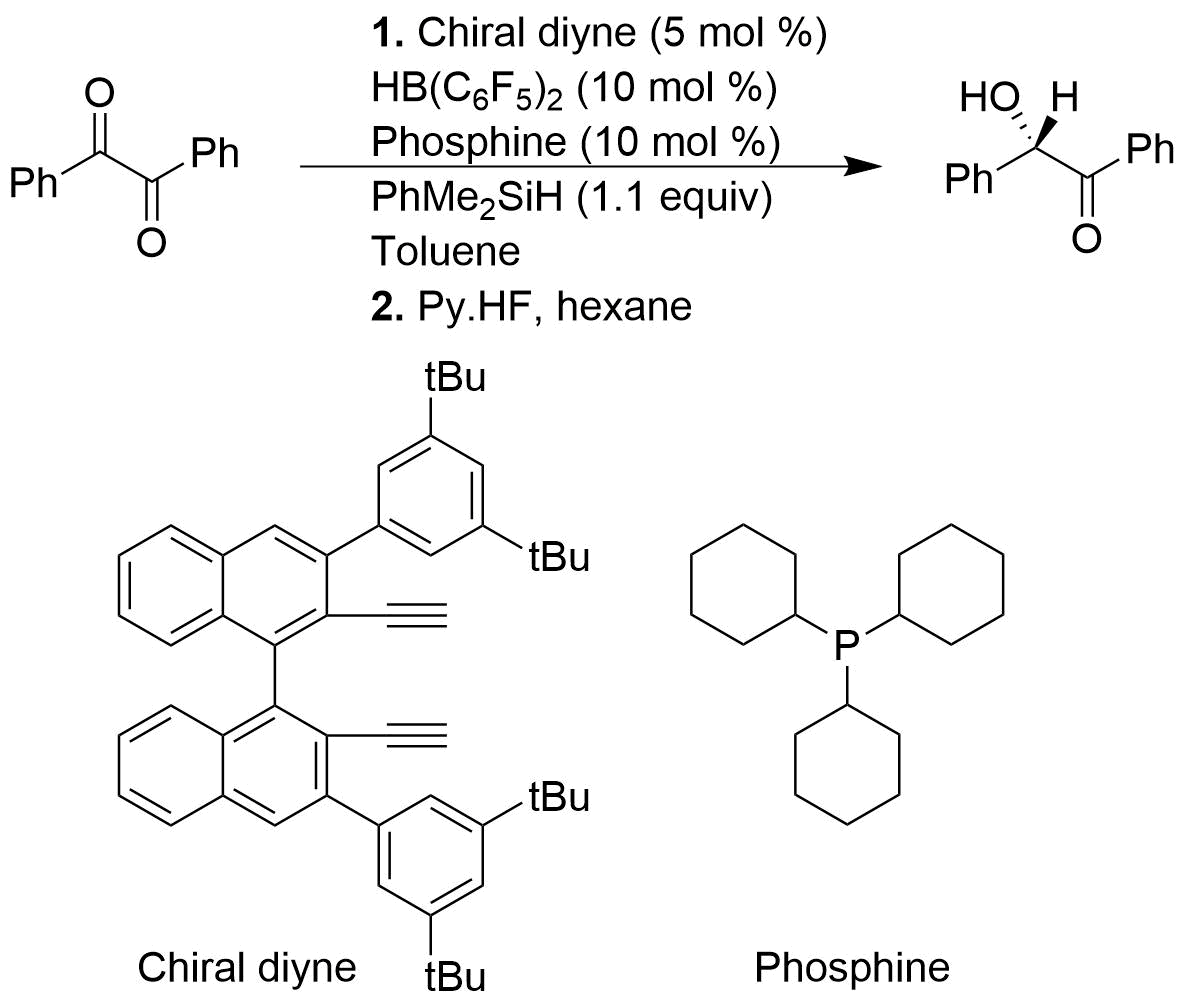
Asymmetric hydrosilylation of a diketone by an FLP

=== Alkyne hydrogenation ===
Metal free hydrogenation of unactivated internal alkynes to cis-alkenes is readily achieved using FLP-based catalysts. The condition for this reaction were relatively mild utilising 2 bar of H_{2}. In terms of mechanism, the alkyne material is first hydroborated and then the resulting vinylborane-based FLP can then activate dihydrogen. A protodeborylation step releases the cis-alkene product, which is obtained due to the syn-hydroborylation process, and regenerating the catalyst. While active for alkyne hydrogenation the FLP-based catalysts do not however facilitate the hydrogenation of alkenes to alkanes.

The reaction is a syn-hydroboration, and as a result a high cis selectivity is observed. At the final stage of the catalytic cycle the C_{6}F_{5} group is cleaved more easily than an alkyl group, causing catalyst degradation rather than alkane release. The catalytic cycle has three steps:

- Substrate binding (the hydroboration of alkyne)
- H_{2} cleavage with vinylborane, followed by intramolecular protodeborylation of vinyl substituent, recovering N,N-Dimethyl-2-[(pentafluorophenyl)boryl]aniline
- Release of the cis-alkene

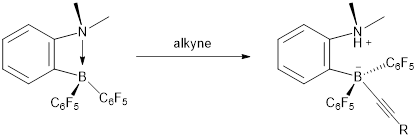
Binding of terminal alkyne to the FLP catalyst

With internal alkynes, a competitive reaction occurs where the proton bound to the nitrogen can be added to the fluorobenzenes. Therefore, this addition does not proceed that much, the formation of the alkene seems favoured.

But terminal alkynes do not bind to the boron through hydroboration but rather through C-H activation. Thus, the addition of the proton to the alkyne will result in the initial terminal alkyne. Hence this hydrogenation process is not suitable to terminal alkynes and will only give pentafluorobenzene.

The metal free hydrogenation of terminal alkynes to the respective alkenes was recently achieved using a pyridone borane based system. This system activates hydrogen readily at room temperature yielding a pyridone borane complex. Dissociation of this complex allows hydroboration of an alkyne by the free borane. Upon protodeborylation by the free pyridone the cis alkene is generated. Hydrogenation of terminal alkynes is possible with this system, because the C-H activation is reversible and competes with hydrogen activation.

=== Borylation ===
Amine-borane FLPs catalyse the borylation of electron-rich aromatic heterocycles (Scheme 1). The reaction is driven by release of hydrogen via C-H activation by the FLP. Aromatic borylations are often used in pharmaceutical development, particularly due to the abundance, low cost and low toxicity of boron compounds compared to noble metals.,

Scheme 1: Mechanism for borylation catalysed by FLP

The substrate for the reaction has two main requirements, strongly linked to the mechanism of borylation. First, the substrate must be electron rich, exemplified by the absence of a reaction with thiophene, whereas its more electron rich derivatives - methoxythiophene and 3,4-ethylenedioxythiophene - can undergo a reaction with the amino-borane. Furthermore, substitution of 1-methylpyrrole (which can react) with the strongly electron withdrawing tertbutyloxycarbonyl (Boc) group at the 2-position completely inhibits the reaction. The second requirement is for the absence of basic amine groups in the substrate, which would otherwise form an unwanted adduct. This can be illustrated by the lack of a reaction with pyrrole, whereas both 1-methyl and N-benzylpyrrole derivatives are able to react.

Further work by the same authors revealed that simply piperidine as the amine R group (as opposed to tetramethylpiperidine, pictured above) accelerated the rate of reaction. Through kinetic and DFT studies the authors proposed that the C-H activation step was more facile than with larger substituents.

Dearomatisation can also be achieved under similar conditions but using N-tosyl indoles. Syn-hyrdoborylated indolines are obtained.

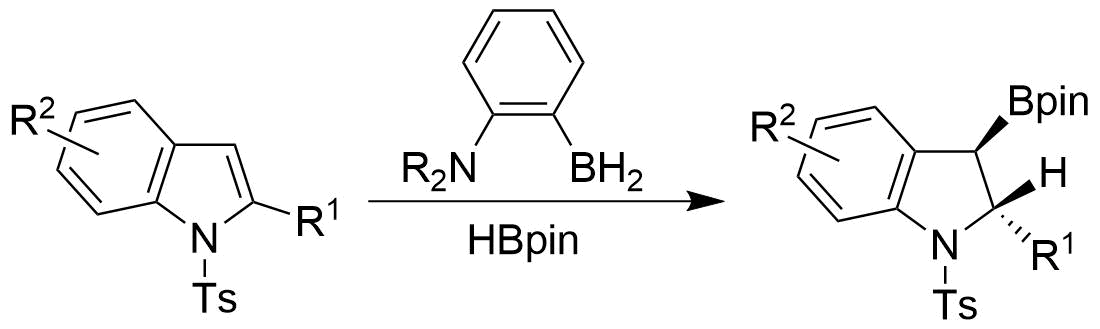
Dearomatisation of N-tosyl indole by HBpin

Borylation of S-H bonds in thiols by a dehydrogenative process has also been observed. Alcohols and amines such as tert-Butanol and tert-Butylamine form stable products that prevent catalysis due to a strong π-bond between the N/O atom's lone pair and boron, whereas the same is not true for thiols, thus allowing for successful catalysis. In addition, successful borylation of Se-H bonds has been achieved. In all cases, the formation of H_{2} gas is a strong driving force for the reactions.

== Carbon capture ==
FLP chemistry is conceptually relevant to carbon capture. Both an intermolecular (Scheme 1) and intramolecular (Scheme 2) FLP consisting of a phosphine and a borane were used to selectively capture and release carbon dioxide. When a solution of the FLP was covered by an atmosphere of CO_{2} at room temperature, the FLP-CO_{2} compound immediately precipitated as a white solid.

Scheme 1: Intermolecular FLP CO_{2} capture and release

Heating the intermolecular FLP-CO_{2} compound in bromobenzene at 80 °C under vacuum for 5 hours caused the release of around half of the CO_{2} and regenerating the two constituent components of the FLP. After several more hours of sitting at room temperature under vacuum, total release of CO_{2} and FLP regeneration had occurred.

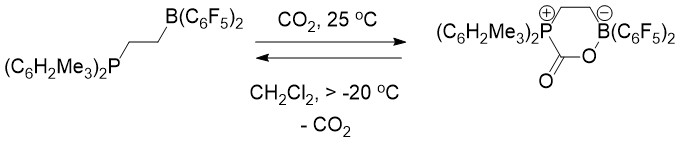
Scheme 2: Intramolecular FLP CO_{2} capture and release

The intramolecular FLP-CO_{2} compound by contrast was stable as a solid at room temperature but fully decomposed at temperatures above -20 °C as a solution in dichloromethane releasing CO_{2} and regenerating the FLP molecule.

This method of FLP carbon capture can be adapted to work in flow chemistry systems.

== Frustrated radical pair ==
Frustrated radical pairs (FRPs) can result from a single electron transfer between the Lewis base and the Lewis acid (sometimes after photoactivation). They can be studied using EPR spectroscopy.

FRPs have been proposed as intermediates to some reactions of FLPs, like the activation of dihydrogen. Such mechanisms have later been rejected as the concentration of frustrated radical pairs due to the spontaneous single electron transfer between FLPs is insignificant, which can be deduced from the oxidation potential of the Lewis base and the reduction potential of the Lewis acid.

Frustrated radical pairs may have synthetic applications in homolytically activating chemical bonds, for instance, in C-H bond functionalization.
