= Non-coordinating anion =

Anion which interacts weakly with cations

Anions that interact weakly with cations are termed non-coordinating anions, although a more accurate term is weakly coordinating anion. Non-coordinating anions are useful in studying the reactivity of electrophilic cations. They are commonly found as counterions for cationic metal complexes with an unsaturated coordination sphere. These special anions are essential components of homogeneous alkene polymerisation catalysts, where the active catalyst is a coordinatively unsaturated, cationic transition metal complex. For example, they are employed as counterions for the 14 valence electron cations [(C_{5}H_{5})_{2}ZrR]^{+} (R = methyl or a growing polyethylene chain). Complexes derived from non-coordinating anions have been used to catalyze hydrogenation, hydrosilylation, oligomerization, and the living polymerization of alkenes. The popularization of non-coordinating anions has contributed to increased understanding of agostic complexes wherein hydrocarbons and hydrogen serve as ligands. Non-coordinating anions are important components of many superacids, which result from the combination of Brønsted acids and Lewis acids.

== Pre-"BARF" era ==
Before the 1980s, tetrafluoroborate, hexafluorophosphate, and perchlorate were considered weakly coordinating anions. Usually, only by exclusion of conventional solvents were transition metal perchlorate complexes found to exist, for example. It is now appreciated that BF^{−}_{4}, PF^{−}_{6}, and ClO^{−}_{4} bind to electrophilic metal centers of the type use in some catalytic such as cationic Zr(IV) centers. Other anions, such as triflates coordinate to metal cations. On that same theme, tetraphenylborate forms pi-complexes with utilizing its electron-rich phenyl groups as ligands.

== Era of BARF ==
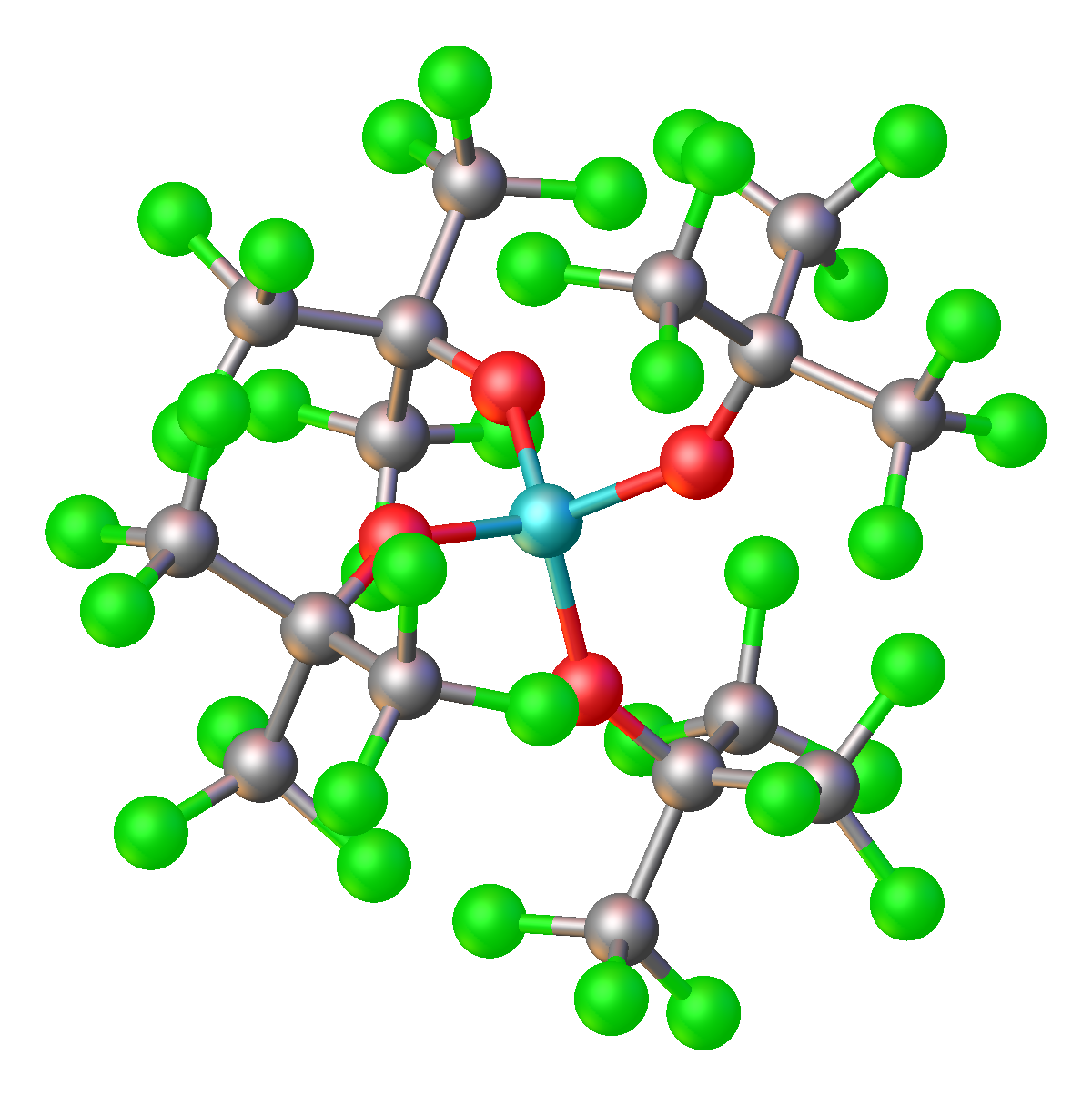
Structure of the weakly coordinating anion [Al(OC(CF_{3})_{3})_{4}]^{−}, illustrating its high symmetry. Color code: green = F, red = O, blue = Al.

A revolution in this area occurred in the 1990s with the introduction of the tetrakis[3,5-bis(trifluoromethyl)phenyl]borate ion, B[3,5-(CF_{3})_{2}C_{6}H_{3}]^{−}_{4}, commonly abbreviated as B(ArF)_{4}^{−} and colloquially called "BARF". This anion is far less coordinating than tetrafluoroborate, hexafluorophosphate, and perchlorate, and consequently has enabled the study of still more electrophilic cations. Related tetrahedral anions include tetrakis(pentafluorophenyl)borate (B(C_{6}F_{5})^{−}_{4}) and polyfluoroalkoxyaluminates such as |Al[OC(CF_{3})_{3}]^{−}_{4}.

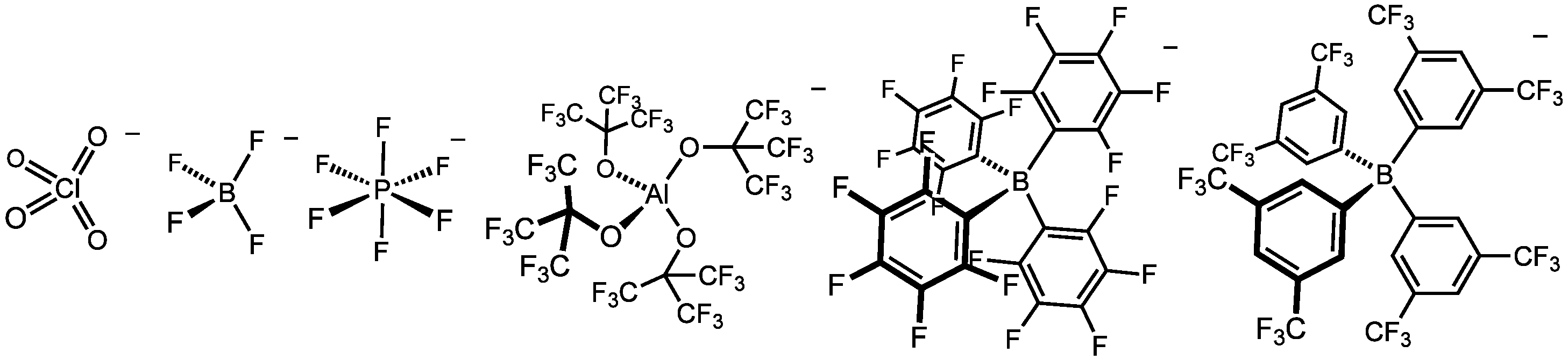

In the bulky borates and aluminates, the negative charge is symmetrically distributed over many electronegative atoms. Related anions are derived from tris(pentafluorophenyl)boron B(C_{6}F_{5})_{3}. Another advantage of these anions is that their salts are more soluble in non-polar organic solvents such as dichloromethane, toluene, and, in some cases, even alkanes. Polar solvents, such as acetonitrile, THF, and water, tend to bind to electrophilic centers, in which cases, the use of a non-coordinating anion is pointless.

Salts of the anion B[3,5-(CF_{3})_{2}C_{6}H_{3}]^{−}_{4} were first reported by Kobayashi and co-workers. For that reason, it is sometimes referred to as Kobayashi's anion. Kobayashi's method of preparation has been superseded by a safer route.

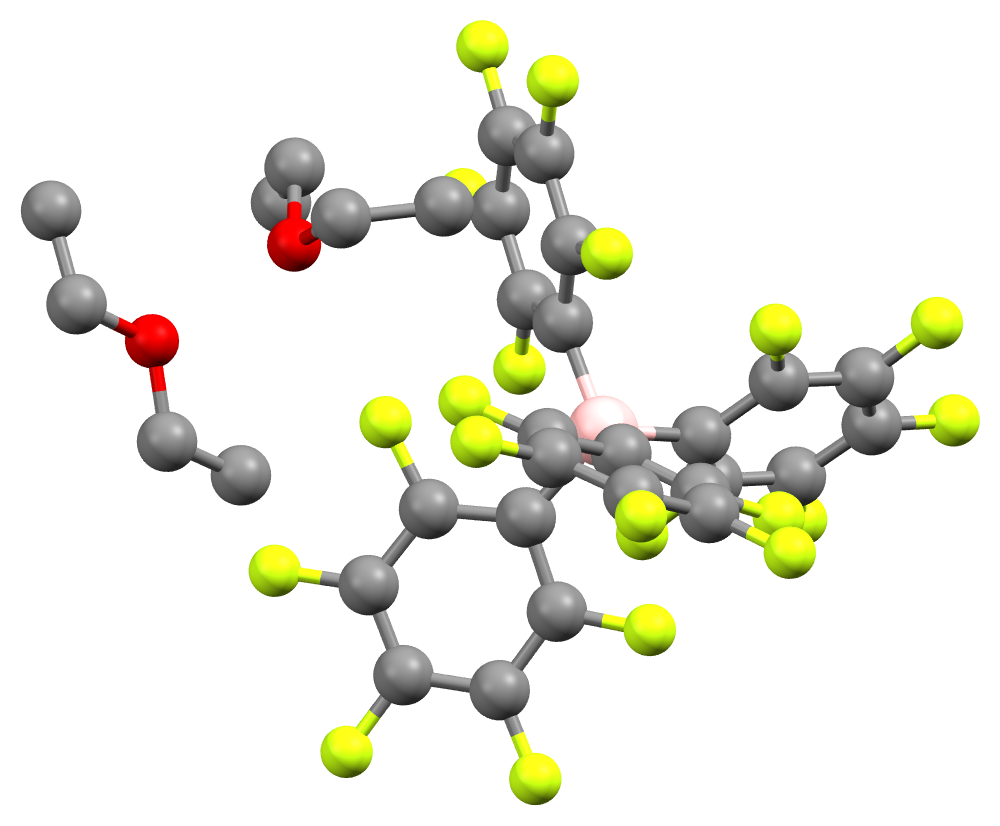
The crystal structure of the compound [H(Et_{2}O)_{2}][B(C_{6}F_{5})_{4}]. H atoms are omitted from the image. Color code: red = O, yellow = F, gray = C.

The neutral molecules that represent the parents to the non-coordinating anions are strong Lewis acids, e.g. boron trifluoride, BF_{3} and phosphorus pentafluoride, PF_{5}. A notable Lewis acid of this genre is tris(pentafluorophenyl)borane, B(C_{6}F_{5})_{3}, which abstracts alkyl ligands:

(C_{5}H_{5})_{2}Zr(CH_{3})_{2} + B(C_{6}F_{5})_{3} → [(C_{5}H_{5})_{2}Zr(CH_{3})]^{+}[(CH_{3})B(C_{6}F_{5})_{3}]^{−}

== Other types of non-coordinating anions ==
Another large class of non-coordinating anions are derived from carborane anion CB_{11}H^{−}_{12}. Using this anion, the first example of a three-coordinate silicon compound, the salt [(mesityl)_{3}Si][HCB_{11}Me_{5}Br_{6}] contains a non-coordinating anion derived from a carborane.
