= Bromopentafluorobenzene =

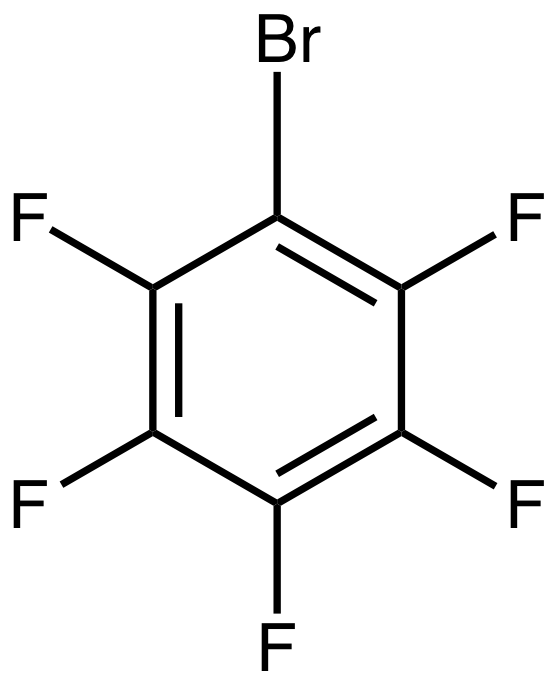

Names
- Preferred IUPAC name Bromopenta(fluoro)benzene
- Other names Bromoperfluorobenzene

Identifiers
CAS Number	344-04-7
3D model (JSmol)	Interactive image
ChEMBL	ChEMBL1231233
ChemSpider	21168727
ECHA InfoCard	100.005.863
EC Number	206-449-0
PubChem CID	9578
UNII	S88219080S
CompTox Dashboard (EPA)	DTXSID3047136
- InChI: InChI=1S/C6BrF5/c7-1-2(8)4(10)6(12)5(11)3(1)9 Key: XEKTVXADUPBFOA-UHFFFAOYSA-N
- SMILES: C1(=C(C(=C(C(=C1F)F)Br)F)F)F

Properties
Chemical formula	C_{6}BrF_{5}
Molar mass	246.962 g·mol^{−1}
Appearance	colorless liquid
Density	1.9503 g/cm^{3}
Melting point	−31 °C (−24 °F; 242 K)
Boiling point	137 °C (279 °F; 410 K)
Solubility in water	low

Hazards
- GHS labelling
Pictograms	(GHS07: Exclamation mark)
Signal word	Warning
Hazard statements	H315, H319, H335
Precautionary statements	P261, P264, P271, P280, P302+P352, P304+P340, P305+P351+P338, P312, P321, P332+P313, P337+P313, P362, P403+P233, P405, P501
- Except where otherwise noted, data are given for materials in their standard state (at 25 °C [77 °F], 100 kPa). Infobox references

Bromopentafluorobenzene is an organofluorine compound with the formula C_{6}F_{5}Br. It is a colorless liquid that is used to prepare pentafluophenyl compounds. These syntheses typically proceed via the intermediacy of C_{6}F_{5}Li or the Grignard reagent. Illustrative is preparation of tris(pentafluorophenyl)borane:

3 C_{6}F_{5}MgBr + BCl_{3} → (C_{6}F_{5})_{3}B + 3 MgBrCl

Other derivatives include LiB(C_{6}F_{5})_{4}, [CuC_{6}F_{5}]_{4}, and Ni(C_{6}F_{5})_{2}(dioxane)_{2}.
