= Tris(pentafluorophenyl)borane =

Chemical compound

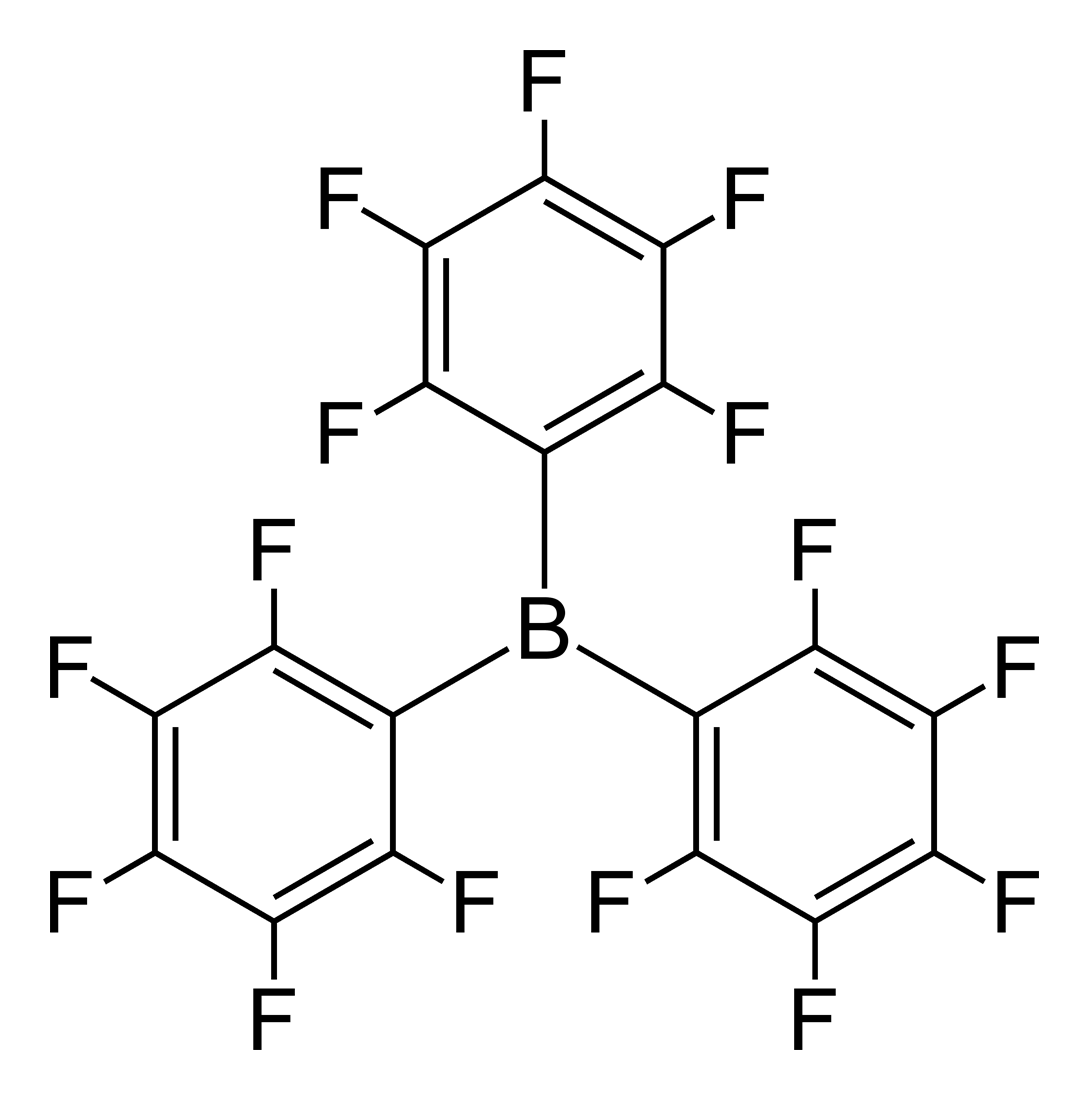
- Tris(pentafluorphenyl)boron

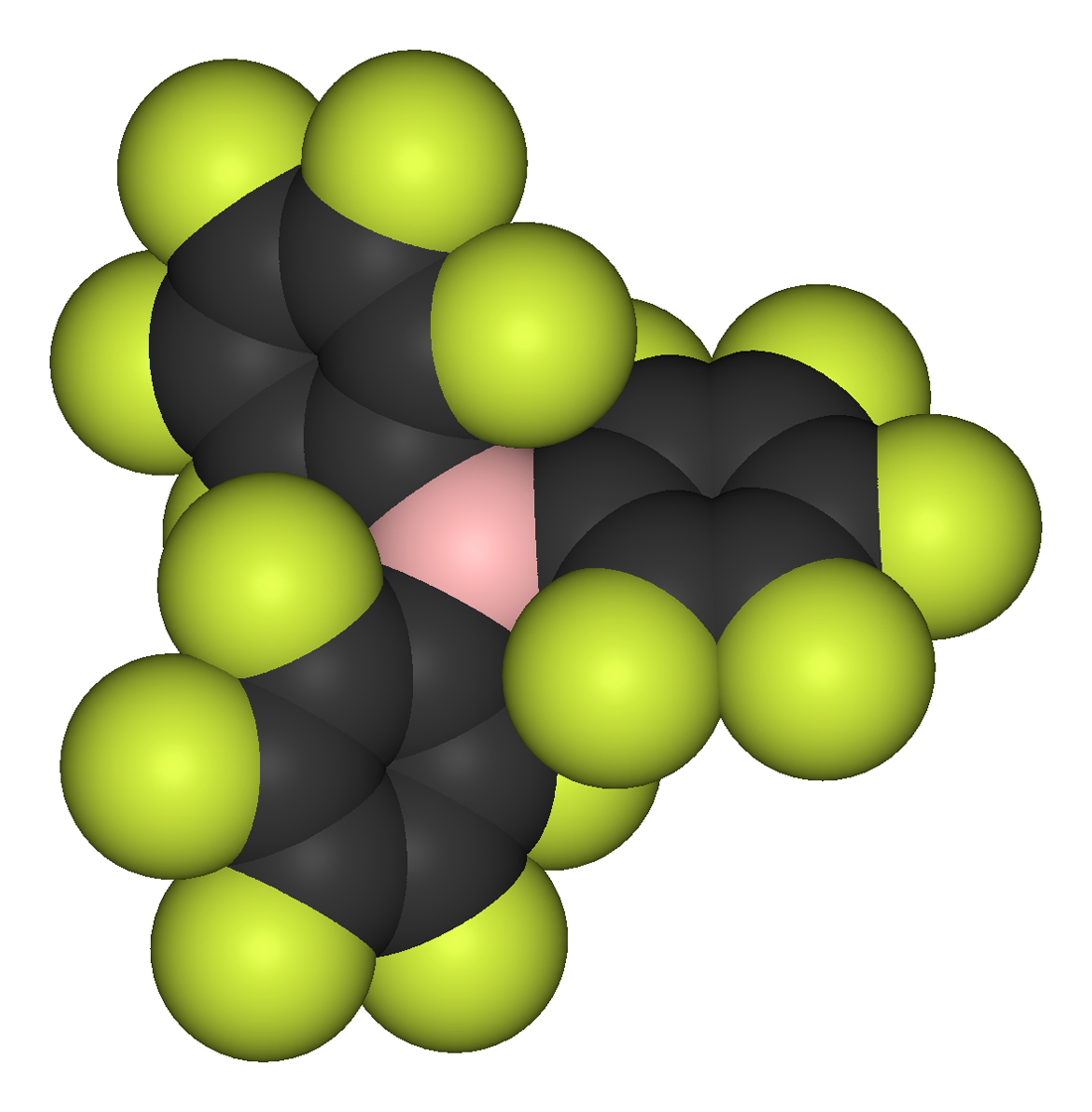

Names
- Preferred IUPAC name Tris(pentafluorophenyl)borane
- Other names Perfluorotriphenylboron; Tris(pentafluorophenyl)boron

Identifiers
CAS Number	1109-15-5
3D model (JSmol)	Interactive image
ChemSpider	505917
ECHA InfoCard	100.101.316
PubChem CID	582056
UNII	I3WU5E2578
CompTox Dashboard (EPA)	DTXSID6074594
- InChI: InChI=1S/C18BF15/c20-4-1(5(21)11(27)16(32)10(4)26)19(2-6(22)12(28)17(33)13(29)7(2)23)3-8(24)14(30)18(34)15(31)9(3)25 Key: OBAJXDYVZBHCGT-UHFFFAOYSA-N
- SMILES: B(c1c(c(c(c(c1F)F)F)F)F)(c2c(c(c(c(c2F)F)F)F)F)c3c(c(c(c(c3F)F)F)F)F

Properties
Chemical formula	C_{18}F_{15}B
Molar mass	511.98 g/mol
Appearance	colorless solid
Melting point	126 to 131 °C (259 to 268 °F; 399 to 404 K)
Solubility in water	forms adduct

Structure
Molecular shape	trigonal planar
Dipole moment	0 D

Hazards
- GHS labelling
Pictograms	(GHS07: Exclamation mark)
Signal word	Danger
Hazard statements	H315, H319, H335
Precautionary statements	P261, P280, P302+P352, P305+P351+P338

Related compounds
Related compounds	Triphenylborane (C_{6}H_{5})_{3}B; BF_{3}
- Except where otherwise noted, data are given for materials in their standard state (at 25 °C [77 °F], 100 kPa). verify (what is ?) Infobox references

Tris(pentafluorophenyl)borane, sometimes referred to as "BCF", is the chemical compound (C_{6}F_{5})_{3}B. It is a white, volatile solid. The molecule consists of three pentafluorophenyl groups attached in a "paddle-wheel" manner to a central boron atom; the BC_{3} core is planar. It has been described as the “ideal Lewis acid” because of its high thermal stability and the relative inertness of the B-C bonds. Related fluoro-substituted boron compounds, such as those containing B−CF_{3} groups, decompose with formation of B-F bonds. Tris(pentafluorophenyl)borane is thermally stable at temperatures well over 200 °C, resistant to oxygen, and water-tolerant.

== Preparation ==
Tris(pentafluorophenyl)borane is prepared using a Grignard reagent derived from bromopentafluorobenzene:

3C_{6}F_{5}MgBr + BCl_{3} → (C_{6}F_{5})_{3}B + 3MgBrCl

The synthesis originally employed C_{6}F_{5}Li, but this reagent can detonate with elimination of LiF.

== Structure ==
The structure of tris(pentafluorophenyl)borane (BCF) was determined by gas electron diffraction. It has a propeller-like arrangement of its three pentafluorophenyl groups with a torsional angle of 40.6(3)° for the deviation of these groups from a hypothetically planar arrangement. Compared with a torsional angle of 56.8(4)° for tris(perfluoro-para-tolyl)borane, which is a stronger Lewis acid than BCF, this shows that there is some delocalization of electron density from the para-fluorine atoms to the boron atom that reduces its acidity.

== Lewis acidity ==
The most noteworthy property of this molecule is its strong Lewis acidity. Its Lewis acid strength, as quantified by experimental equilibrium constants, is by 7 orders of magnitude higher than the one of structurally analogous triphenylborane. Experimental equilibrium measurements, its AN value (Gutmann-Beckett method) as well as quantum-chemical calculations all indicate that the Lewis acidity of B(C_{6}F_{5})_{3} is slightly lower than that of BF_{3} and significantly reduced compared to BCl_{3}. B(C_{6}F_{5})_{3} forms a strong Lewis adduct with water, which was shown to be a strong Brønsted acid having an acidity comparable to hydrochloric acid (in acetonitrile). In consequence, even traces of moisture are able to deactivate B(C_{6}F_{5})_{3} and remaining catalytic activity might only be due to the Brønsted acidity of the water adduct.

=== Applications in catalysis ===
In one application (C_{6}F_{5})_{3}B forms noncoordinating anions by removing anionic ligands from metal centers. Illustrative is a reaction that give rise to alkene polymerization catalysts where tris(pentafluorophenyl)boron is used as an activator or cocatalyst:

(C_{6}F_{5})_{3}B + (C_{5}H_{5})_{2}Zr(CH_{3})_{2} → [(C_{5}H_{5})_{2}ZrCH_{3}]^{+}[(C_{6}F_{5})_{3}BCH_{3}]^{−}

In this process, the strongly coordinating methyl group transfers to the boron to expose a reactive site on zirconium. The resulting cationic zirconocene species is stabilised by the non coordinating borane anion. The exposed site on the zirconium allows for coordination of alkenes, whereupon migratory insertion into the remaining carbon-methyl ligand gives rise to a propyl ligand this process continues resulting in the growth of a polymer chain. This reagent has led to the development of immobilised catalyst/activator species; where the catalyst/activator is immobilised on an inert inorganic support such as silica.

Tris(pentafluorophenyl)borane is also capable of abstracting hydride to give [(C_{6}F_{5})_{3}BH]^{−}, and it catalyzes hydrosilylation of aldehydes. Otherwise (C_{6}F_{5})_{3}B binds to a wide range of Lewis bases, even weak ones. The compound is hygroscopic, forming the trihydrate [(C_{6}F_{5})_{3}BOH_{2}](H_{2}O)_{2}, wherein one water in coordinated to boron and the other two waters are hydrogen-bonded to the coordinated water.

Related compounds are pentafluorophenylboron halides.

== Frustrated Lewis pair ==
Tris(pentafluorophenyl)borane is a key reagent leading to the concept of frustrated Lewis pairs. The combination of BCF and bulky basic phosphines, such as tricyclohexylphosphine (PCy_{3}) cleaves H_{2}:

(C_{6}F_{5})_{3}B + PCy_{3} + H_{2} → (C_{6}F_{5})_{3}BH^{−} + HPCy_{3}^{+}

Many related phosphines, boranes, and substrates participate in related reactions.

== Other reactions ==
(C_{6}F_{5})_{3}B was used to prepare a compound containing a Xe-C bond:

(C_{6}F_{5})_{3}B + XeF_{2} → [C_{6}F_{5}Xe]^{+}[(C_{6}F_{5})_{2}BF_{2}]^{−}

Upon reaction with pentafluorophenyllithium, the salt of the noncoordinating anion lithium tetrakis(pentafluorophenyl)borate is formed.

(C_{6}F_{5})_{3}B + C_{6}F_{5}Li → Li[(C_{6}F_{5})_{4}B]

B(C_{6}F_{5})_{3} reacts with dimesitylphosphine to give the zwitterionic phosphonic-boronate (mes = C_{6}H_{2}Me_{3}):

(C_{6}F_{5})_{3}B + mes_{2}PH → (C_{6}F_{5})_{2}B(F)−C_{6}F_{4}−P(H)mes_{2}

This zwitterionic salt can be converted to a system that reversibly binds molecular H_{2}:

(C_{6}F_{5})_{2}B(F)−C_{6}F_{4}−P(H)mes_{2} + Me_{2}SiHCl → (C_{6}F_{5})_{2}B(H)−C_{6}F_{4}−P(H)mes_{2} + Me_{2}SiFCl
(C_{6}F_{5})_{2}B(H)−C_{6}F_{4}−P(H)mes_{2} → (C_{6}F_{5})_{2}B−C_{6}F_{4}−Pmes_{2} + H_{2}

== Extra reading ==
- Lawson, James R.; Melen, Rebecca L. (3 February 2017). "Tris(pentafluorophenyl)borane and Beyond: Modern Advances in Borylation Chemistry". Inorganic Chemistry. 56 (15): 8627–8643. doi:10.1021/acs.inorgchem.6b02911. PMID 28157303.
