= Polyfluoroalkoxyaluminates =

Class of chemical compounds

Polyfluoroalkoxyaluminates (PFAA) are weakly coordinating anions many of which are of the form [Al(OR_{F})_{4}]^{−}. Most PFAA's possesses an Al(III) center coordinated by four ^{−}OR_{F} (R_{F} = -CPh(CF_{3})_{2} (hfpp), -CH(CF_{3})_{2} (hfip), -C(CH_{3})(CF_{3})_{2} (hftb), -C(CF_{3})_{3} (pftb)) ligands, giving the anion an overall -1 charge. The most weakly coordinating PFAA is an aluminate dimer, [F{Al(Opftb)_{3}}_{2}]^{−}, which possess a bridging fluoride between two Al(III) centers. The first PFAA, [Al(Ohfpp)_{4}]^{−}, was synthesized in 1996 by Steven Strauss, and several other analogs have since been synthesized, including [Al(Ohfip)_{4}]^{−}, [Al(Ohftb)_{4}]^{−}, and [Al(Opftb)_{4}]^{−} by Ingo Krossing in 2001. These chemically inert and very weakly coordinating ions have been used to stabilize unusual cations, isolate reactive species, and synthesize strong Brønsted acids.

Space-filled crystal structure of Al(OC(CF_{3})_{3})_{4}^{−}. Oxygen atoms are colored red, aluminum pink, carbon gray and fluorine yellow

== Synthesis ==
Work by Strauss demonstrated that the synthesis of Li^{+}[Al(Ohfpp)_{4}]^{−} could be achieved from the reaction of lithium aluminum hydride and HOhfpp. Analogous metal PFAA salts (MPFAA's) were later synthesized by Krossing using a similar synthetic pathway.
$$\ce{LiAlH4 + 4HOR_{F} -> LiAl(OR_{F})4 + 4H2}$$
Reaction of lithium aluminum hydride with four equivalents of polyfluoroalcohol overnight in refluxing toluene yields the desired PFAA's . The colorless products can be precipitated from toluene in high yields on multi-gram scales by cooling at -20 °C for an hour. It can be furthered purified by sublimation.

== Cation exchange and reactivity ==
=== Metal exchange ===
While Li^{+}[Al(Ohfpp)_{4}]^{−} is readily soluble in hydrocarbon solvents, presumably due to aryl substituents, Li^{+}[Al(Ohfip)_{4}]^{−}, Li^{+}[Al(Ohftb)_{4}]^{−}, and Li^{+}[Al(Opftb)_{4}]^{−} are only sparingly soluble in common organic solvents including dichloromethane (DCM), toluene, and hexane. Their silver analogs are much more soluble however, making AgPFAA's more desirable reagents for liquid phase reactivity.
$$\ce{LiAl(OR_{F})4 + AgF -> AgAl(OR_{F})4 +LiF}$$

Ag^{+}[Al(Ohfip)_{4}]^{−}, Ag^{+}[Al(Ohftb)_{4}]^{−}, and Ag^{+}[Al(Opftb)_{4}]^{−} can be synthesized via salt metathesis reactions; ultrasonication of a suspension of Li^{+}[PFAA]^{−} and an excess of AgF at 40 °C for 12 hours produces the final colorless products in high yields on multigram scales. Analogous M^{+}[Al(Opftb)_{4}]^{−}, M = Na, K, Rb, Cs, salts can also be prepared via the same synthetic route, from the metathesis reactions of Li^{+}[Al(Opftb)_{4}]^{−} with the corresponding MCl salt.

=== Brønsted acid chemistry ===
Strong Brønsted acids, [H(OEt_{2})_{2}]^{+}[Al(Opftb)_{4}]^{−} and [H(THF)_{2}]^{+}[Al(Opftb)_{4}]^{−} , can be prepared via the reaction of Li^{+}[Al(Opftb)_{4}]^{−} with two equivalents of Lewis base, Et_{2}O or THF, and strong acid, HX (X = Cl, Br). [H(OEt_{2})_{2}]^{+}[Al(Opftb)_{4}]^{−} is isolable as a white powder sensitive to air and water and stable at moderately high temperatures. [H(THF)_{2}]^{+}[Al(Opftb)_{4}]^{−} can be isolated as a crystalline solid from a brown oily reside, presumably containing polymerized THF products formed upon addition of strong acid.

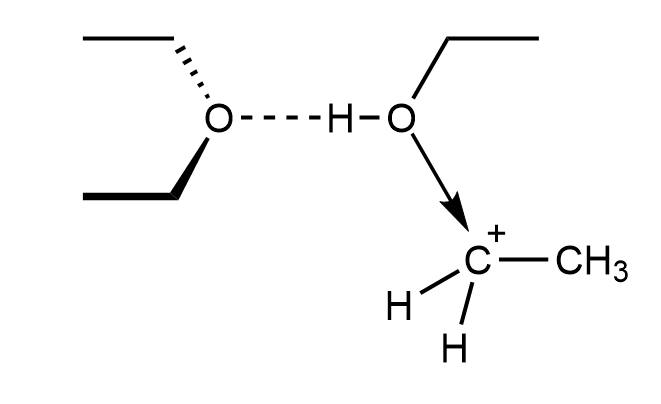
Proposed resonance structure of protonated ether. Recreated from source.

$$\ce{Li+[Al(OR_{F})4]- + 2B + HX -> [H(B)2]+[Al(OR_{F})4]- + LiX}$$

Ab initio calculations and crystallographic structural analysis of [H(OEt_{2})_{2}]^{+}[Al(Opftb)_{4}]^{−} indicate potential unequal sharing of the proton between the two diethyl ether molecules, and the authors propose a solid state structure in which [H(OEt_{2})_{2}]^{+} is described as a diethyl ether molecule acting as a hydrogen bond acceptor from an ethanol molecule which stabilizes an ethyl cation as a Lewis base in one resonance structure.

=== Nitrosonium exchange ===
Nitrosonium salts, NO^{+}[Al(Ohfpp)_{4}]^{−} and NO^{+}[Al(Opftb)_{4}]^{−}, can be prepared via an exchange reaction of the respective lithium salt with nitrosonium hexafluoroantimonate.

$$\ce{Li+[Al(OR_{F})4]- + NO+[SbF6]- -> NO+[Al(OR_{F})4]- + Li+[SbF6]-}$$

The NO^{+}[Al(Opftb)_{4}]^{−} salt can be obtained in much higher yields than the analogous hfpp salt and can be used to oxidize several transition metal and main group element complexes.

== Cation stabilization ==
=== Transition metal complexes ===
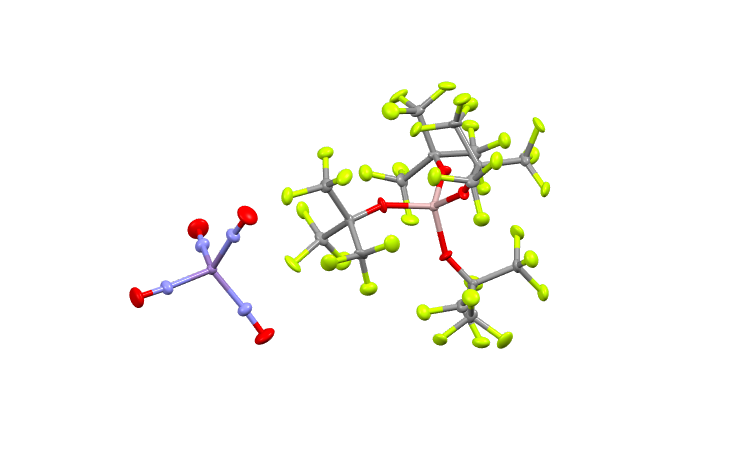
Crystal structure of Mn(NO)_{4}^{+}[Al(OC(CF_{3}))_{4}]^{−} recreated from source. Manganese atoms are colored purple, nitrogen blue, oxygen red, aluminum pink, carbon gray and fluorine yellow.

==== Manganese(V) nitrosyl cation ====
The first metal nitrosyl cation was prepared using the PFAA's [Al(Opftb)_{4}]^{−} and [F{Al(Opftb)_{3}}_{2}]^{−} as stabilizing anions. Ultraviolet radiation of Mn_{2}(CO)_{10} under a NO(g) atmosphere yields Mn(CO)(NO)_{3}. Further oxidation of this complex is achieved through reaction with both NO^{+}[PFAA]^{−}'s to yield Mn(NO)_{4}^{+}[PFAA]^{−} 's as deep red solids that are stable for months under an inert atmosphere. The Mn(NO)_{4}^{+} cation is tetrahedral and linear NO^{−} ligand in both salts indicate 3 electron donation to the Mn(V) metal center. Rigorous tetrahedral geometry of the Mn(NO)_{4}^{+}[F{Al(Opftb)_{3}}_{2}]^{−} salt indicates a pseudo-gas phase environment about the cation due to the weakly coordinating behavior of the anionic PFAA.

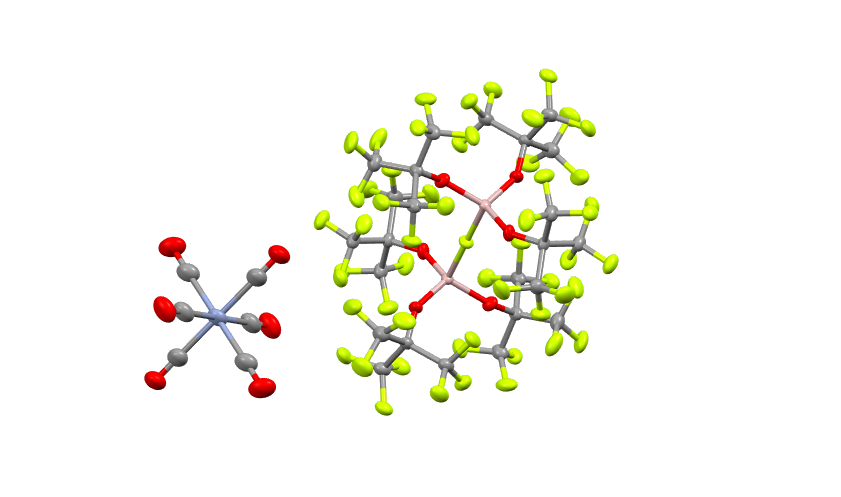
Crystal Structure of [Cr(CO)6]^{•+}[F{Al(pftb)_{3}}_{2}]^{−} recreated from source. Chromium atoms are colored purple, oxygen red, aluminum pink, carbon gray and fluorine yellow.

==== Chromium(I) carbonyl radical cation ====
Synthesis of the chromium(I) homoleptic radical cation, [Cr(CO)6]^{•+}, is achieved by use of PFAA's [Al(Opftb)_{4}]^{−} and [F{Al(Opftb)_{3}}_{2}]^{−} as stabilizing anions. Oxidation of Cr(CO)_{6} by NO^{+}[PFAA]^{−}'s under cold vacuum for short reaction times yields the kinetic product [Cr(CO)6]^{•+}[PFAA]^{−} as a pale yellow crystalline solid. Oxidation in a closed room temperature vessel for long reaction times yields the thermodynamic product [Cr(CO)_{5}(NO)]^{+}[PFAA]^{−} as an orange crystalline solid. Assignment of the thermodynamic and kinetic products was further supported by ab initio calculations. Fluctional Jahn-Teller distortions at room temperature are indicated by the presence of a broad band in the Raman spectra of these compounds.

==== Cobalt(I) sandwich complex ====
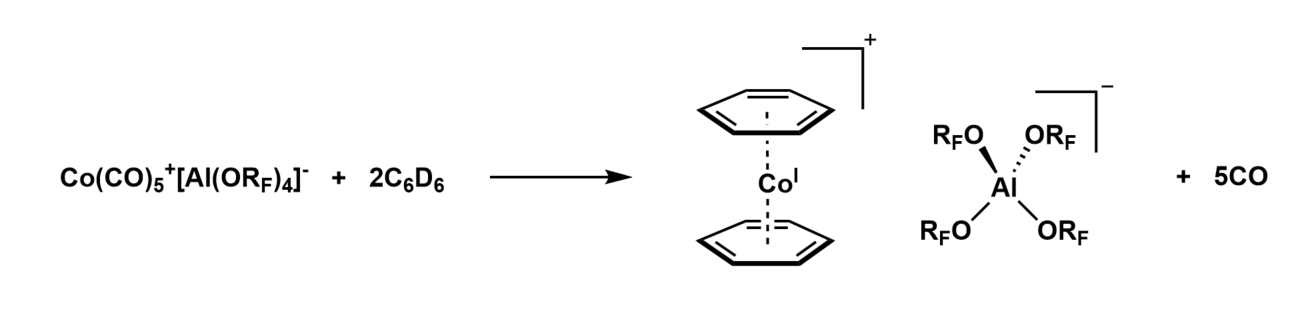
Synthesis of Co(I)bz_{2}^{+}[Al(OR_{F})_{4}]^{−} (-OR_{F} = -OC(CF_{3})).

Cationic cobalt(I) sandwich complexes of the form Co(arene)_{2}^{+}[PFAA]- can be prepared via two synthetic routes (arene = mesitylene, benzene, fluorobenzene, o-difluorobenzene & PFAA = [Al(Opftb)_{4}]^{−} and [F{Al(Opftb)_{3}}_{2}]^{−}). Reaction of Co(CO)_{5}^{+}[PFAA]^{−} with arene yields the cobalt(I) sandwich complex stabilized by a PFAA anion. Additionally, the oxidation of Co_{2}(CO)_{8} with Ag^{+}[PFAA]^{−} and arene yields the cobalt(I) sandwich complex stabilized by a PFAA anion and produces silver metal and gaseous carbon monoxide. Structural analysis of Co(I)bz_{2}^{+}[Al{OC(CF_{3})}_{4}]^{−} reveals the sandwich complex is slightly staggered, twisted 6° from an eclipsed confirmation. 3° bending of C-H bonds towards the cobalt center yields D_{6} symmetry. The cobalt sandwich complex can be used as a precursor to synthesize Co(P^{t}Bu_{3})_{2} upon ligand substitution.

==== Nickel(I) complexes ====
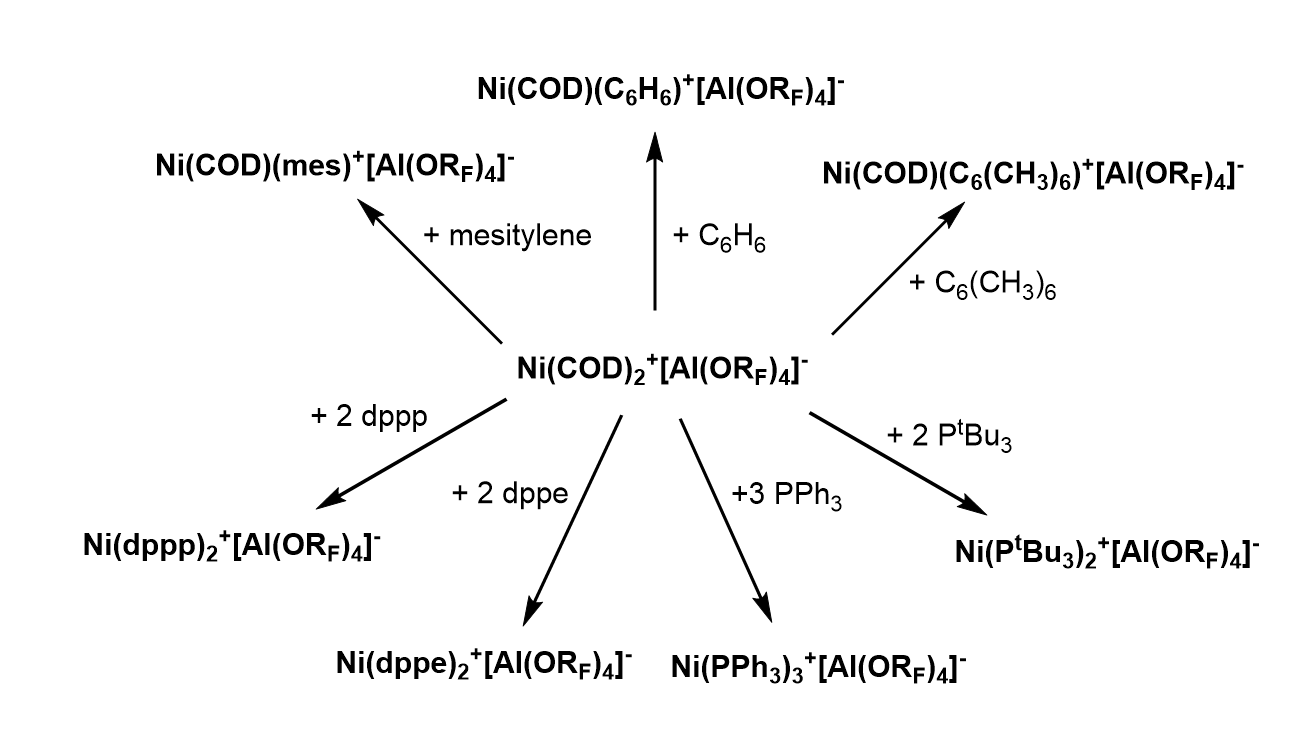
Ligand substitution pathways to produce nickel(I) arene and phosphine cations.

Oxidation of Ni(COD)_{2} with Ag^{+}[Al(Opftb)_{4}]^{−} yields Ni(COD)_{2}^{+}[Al(Opftb)_{4}]^{−} as an orange crystalline solid. In the solid phase the material is stable to air and moisture, but is sensitive to diatomic oxygen in solution. EPR analysis reveals that 90% of the unpaired electron spin density is located on the nickel center. This nickel salt serves as synthetically feasible precursor to a series of nickel(I) arene and phosphine cations stabilized by PFAA's. Reactions of Ni(COD)_{2}^{+}[Al(Opftb)_{4}]^{−} with mesitylene, benzene, or hexamethyl benzene results in substitution of one COD ligand. Arene ligand exchange results in partial electron spin delocalization onto the aromatic arene ligand, with 84-87% of the unpaired electron spin density located on the nickel center. Reactions of Ni(COD)_{2}^{+}[Al(Opftb)_{4}]^{−} with phosphines results in complete ligand substitution and dissociation of COD. Addition of chelating phosphines, 1,3-bis(diphenylphosphino)propane (dppp) and 1,2-bis(diphenylphosphino)propane (dppe) yields four coordinate distorted tetrahedral nickel cations. Addition of triphenylphosphine yields a three coordinate trigonal planar cation. Addition of bulky tri-tert-butylphosphine yields a two coordinate linear cation.

=== Main group element complexes ===
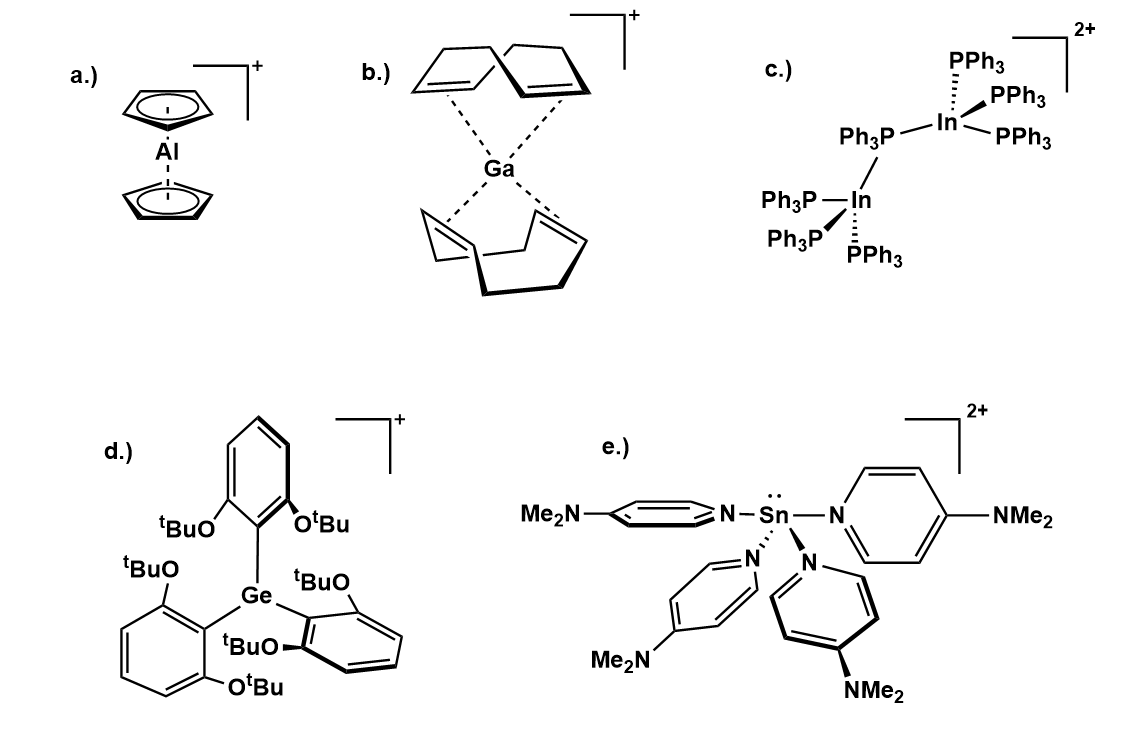
Survey of main group cations stabilized by PFAAs. a.) AlCp_{2}^{+} b.) Ga(COD)_{2}^{+} c.) In_{2}(PPh_{3})_{7}^{2+} d.) Ge[C_{6}H_{3}(O^{t}Bu)_{2}]_{3}^{+} e.) Sn(dmap)_{4}^{2+}

==== AlCp_{2}^{+} ====
Reaction of AlCp_{3} with the strong Brønsted acid, [H(OEt_{2})_{2}]^{+}[Al(Opftb)_{4}]^{−}, yields [AlCp_{2}]^{+}[Al(Opftb)_{4}]^{−} as colorless solid as well as [AlCp_{2}•2Et_{2}O]^{+}[Al(Opftb)_{4}]^{−}. The former complex exhibits nearly identical bonding to its analog AlCp*_{2}^{+} while the Cp substituents in the later compound exhibit η^{1} bonding due to two diethyl ether substituents bound to the aluminum center.

==== Gallium(I) olefin complex ====
The first main-group homoleptic olefin compound isolable in bulk was synthesized using a stabilizing PFAA counter ion. [Ga(PhF)_{2}]^{+}[Al(Opftb)_{4}]^{−} can be prepared via the oxidation of Ga by Ag^{+}[Al(Opftb)_{4}]^{−} in the presence of fluorobenzene. Fluorobenzene ligands can then be displaced by COD to produce [Ga(COD)_{2}]^{+}[Al(Opftb)_{4}]^{−}. AIM analysis of the compound reveals minimal back bonding to the olefin double bonds, characterizing the ligand-Ga interactions as primarily electrostatic. The gallium salt serves as a precursor to gallium phosphine complexes, as addition of triphenylphosphine yields [Ga(PPh_{3})_{2}]^{+}[Al(Opftb)_{4}]^{−}.

Germyl cation

Halide abstraction from BrGeR_{3} (R = [C_{6}H_{3}(O^{t}Bu)_{2}]_{3}) using Ag^{+}[Al(Opftb)_{4}]- yields the germyl cation Ge[C_{6}H_{3}(O^{t}Bu)_{2}]_{3}^{+}, stabilized by bulky ligands and a weakly coordinating PFAA anion. The aryl substituents are oriented in a paddlewheel confirmation about the germanium center and possess shortened Ge-C bonds due to partial double bonding character. Due to the weakly coordinating nature of the PFAA anion, solid state structure of the salt reveals no ion-ion contacts between the germyl cation and the PFAA, giving rise to a very electrophilic germanium species.

==== Tin(II) dications ====
Various tin(II) dications can be synthesized with PFAA's as counterions. [Sn(MeCN)_{6}]^{2+}[Al(Opftb)_{4}]_{2}^{−} can be prepared via the oxidation of tin metal with NO^{+}[Al(Opftb)_{4}]^{−}. Addition of pyrazine to this complex results in ligand substitution to produce [Sn(pyz)_{2}(MeCN)_{4}]^{2+}, while addition of triphenylphosphine produces [Sn(PPh_{3})_{2}(MeCN)_{4}]^{2+}•MeCN. The salt, Sn(dmap)_{4}^{2+}[Al(Opftb)_{4}]_{2}^{−} is prepared by a different synthetic route. Halide abstraction of SnCpCl by Li^{+}[Al(Opftb)_{4}]^{−} yields [SnCp]^{+} which produces Sn(dmap)_{4}^{2+} upon addition of dmap. Sn(dmap)_{4}^{2+} adopts a see-saw geometry with dmap ligands stabilizing a Sn(II) center.

==== P_{9}^{+} ====
The cationic P_{9}^{+} cluster can be isolated from the oxidation of P_{4} by NO^{+}[Al(Opftb)_{4}]^{−}. In the multistep reaction, [P_{4}NO]^{+} is a proposed intermediate from analysis of collision-induced dissociation (CID) experiments. Complex coupling present in the ^{31}P NMR spectra of P_{9}^{+} allowed for the determination of its structure.

== Applications ==
=== Ionic liquids ===
Due to low polarizability, large charge delocalization, and high conformational flexibility, PFAA salts are potentially useful ionic liquids. Several PFAA salts, including those of [Al(Ohfip)_{4}]^{−}, possess melting points as low as 273 K or colder. Walden Plots, which are created by plotting the logarithm of conductivity against the logarithm of inverse viscosity, indicate that several [Al(Ohfip)_{4}]^{−} ionic liquids are potentially better than the best commercially available ionic liquids. Better ionic liquids are defined to have high conductivities and high viscosities.

== See also ==
- Non-coordinating anions
