= Tricyclohexylphosphine =

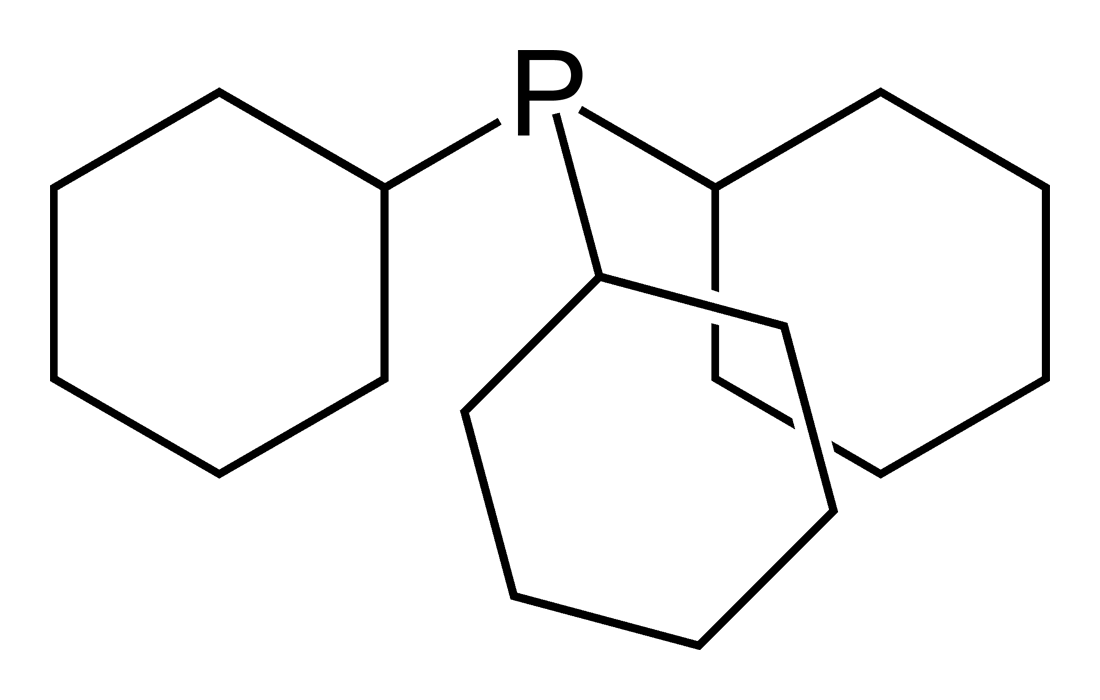

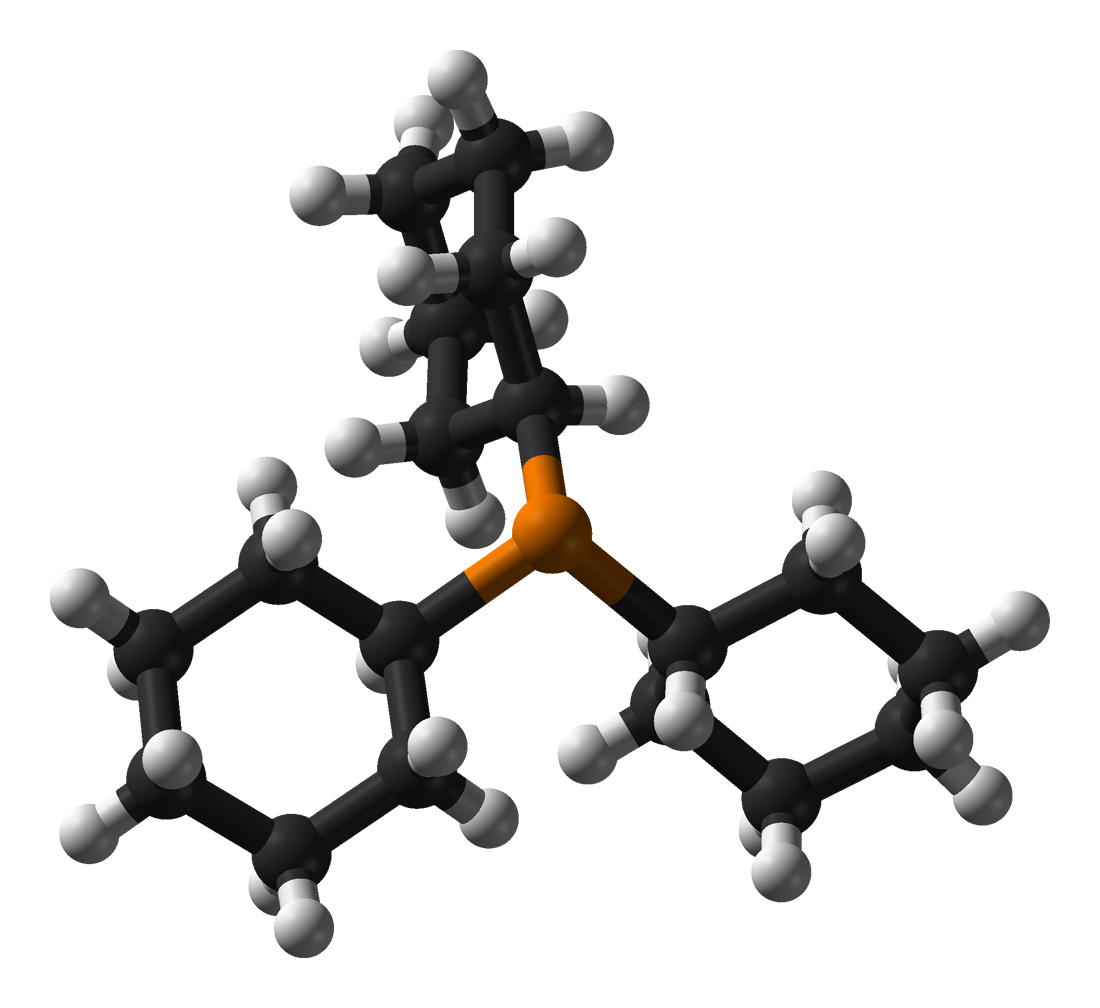

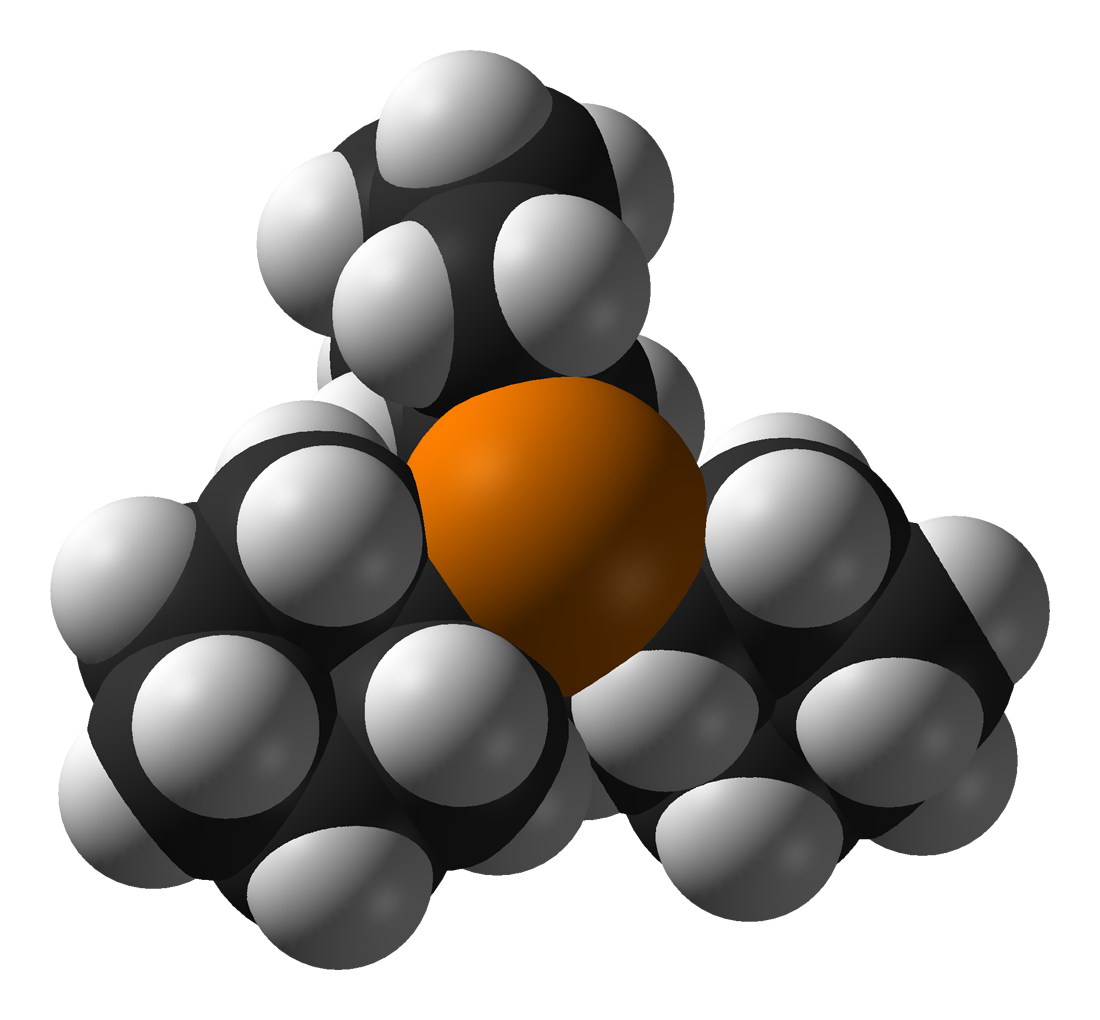

Names
- Preferred IUPAC name Tricyclohexylphosphane
- Other names P(Cy)_{3} PCy_{3}

Identifiers
CAS Number	2622-14-2
3D model (JSmol)	Interactive image; Interactive image
ChemSpider	68315
ECHA InfoCard	100.018.246
PubChem CID	75806
UNII	34HJS55VCG
CompTox Dashboard (EPA)	DTXSID9062562
- InChI: InChI=1S/C18H33P/c1-4-10-16(11-5-1)19(17-12-6-2-7-13-17)18-14-8-3-9-15-18/h16-18H,1-15H2 Key: WLPUWLXVBWGYMZ-UHFFFAOYSA-N; InChI=1/C18H33P/c1-4-10-16(11-5-1)19(17-12-6-2-7-13-17)18-14-8-3-9-15-18/h16-18H,1-15H2 Key: WLPUWLXVBWGYMZ-UHFFFAOYAM
- SMILES: C1(CCCCC1)P(C2CCCCC2)C3CCCCC3; C1CCC(CC1)P(C2CCCCC2)C3CCCCC3

Properties
Chemical formula	C_{18}H_{33}P
Molar mass	280.43 g mol^{−1}
Appearance	white solid
Melting point	82 °C (180 °F; 355 K)
Solubility in water	organic solvents

Hazards
- Occupational safety and health (OHS/OSH)
Main hazards	toxic
- Except where otherwise noted, data are given for materials in their standard state (at 25 °C [77 °F], 100 kPa). verify (what is ?) Infobox references

Tricyclohexylphosphine is the tertiary phosphine with the formula P(C_{6}H_{11})_{3}. Commonly used as a ligand in organometallic chemistry, it is often abbreviated to PCy_{3}, where Cy stands for cyclohexyl. It is characterized by both high basicity (pK_{a} = 9.7) and a large ligand cone angle (170°).

Important complexes containing P(Cy)_{3} ligands include the 2005 Nobel Prize-winning Grubbs' catalyst and the homogeneous hydrogenation catalyst Crabtree's catalyst.

Grubbs' catalyst (first generation)

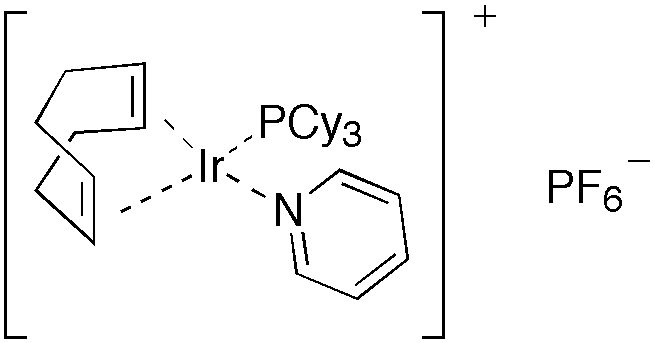
Crabtree's catalyst
